= 1892 Victorian colonial election =

← 1889	20 April 1892	1894 →

All 95 seats in the Victorian Legislative Assembly 48 seats needed for a majority
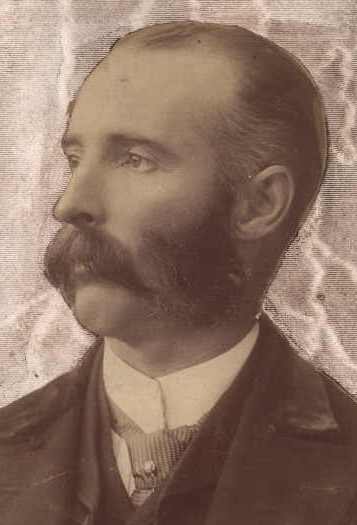

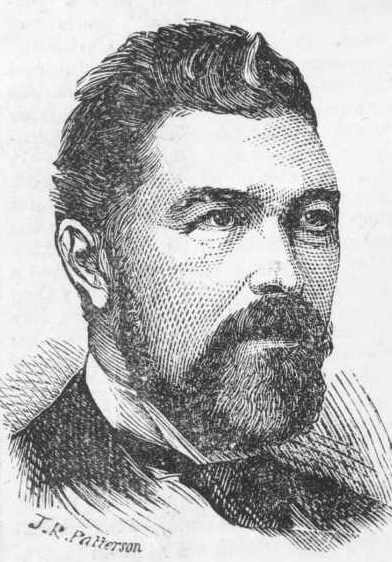

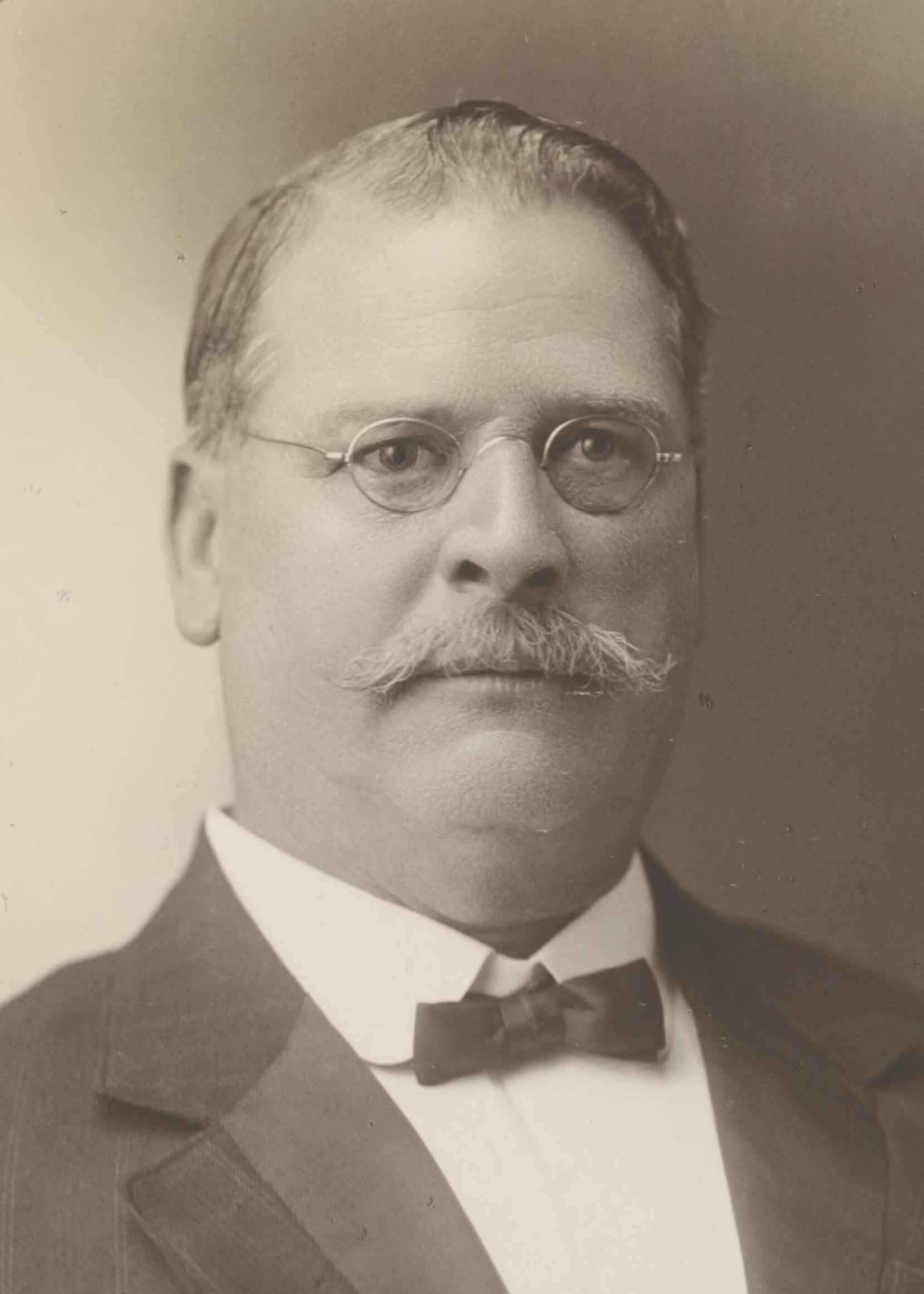
	First party	Second party	Third party
Leader	William Shiels	James Patterson	William Trenwith
Party	Liberal	Conservative	Labour
Leader's seat	Normanby	Castlemaine	Richmond
Seats won	56	28	11
Percentage	52.91	27.11	19.72
Swing			▲1.14%
Premier before election
William Shiels
Liberal
Elected Premier
William Shiels
Liberal

The 1892 Victorian colonial election was held on 20 April 1892 to elect the 15th Parliament of Victoria. All 95 seats in the Legislative Assembly were up for election, though 13 were uncontested.

This was the first election contested by the Labour Party, which was led by William Trenwith.

== Background ==
In February 1892, Premier James Munro, who was deeply in debt, asked his Cabinet to appoint him Victorian Agent-General in London. He then resigned as Premier and immediately took ship from Port Melbourne.

The Liberals turned to William Shiels as a "clean" new leader, and he became the new Premier on 16 February 1892.

== Results ==
13 seats were uncontested at this election, and therefore retained by the incumbent member:

- Liberal: Ararat, Clunes and Allandale, Daylesford, Donald and Swan Hill, Gippsland East, Gippsland North, Numurkah and Nathalia, Warrenheip, Warrnambool (9)
- Conservative: Bourke West, Evelyn, Melbourne, Portland (4)

Legislative Assembly (FPTP)
Party	Votes	%	Swing	Seats	Change
Liberal	102,010	52.91		56	
Conservative	52,260	27.11		28	
Labour	37,777	19.72	+19.72	11	▲11
Independent	280	0.15		0	Steady
Independent Labour	205	0.11		0	Steady
Formal votes	192,792				

== Aftermath ==
The Shiels government was defeated on a vote of confidence on 18 January 1893, and was succeeded by Conservative James Patterson. Patterson himself was defeated on a vote of confidence on 28 August 1894, and sought a dissolution of the house. The Liberals returned to government in 1894, led by George Turner.
