= 1874 Victorian colonial election =

← 1871	25 March to 22 April 1874	1877 →

All 78 seats in the Victorian Legislative Assembly 40 seats needed for a majority
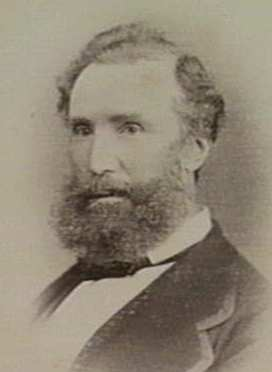

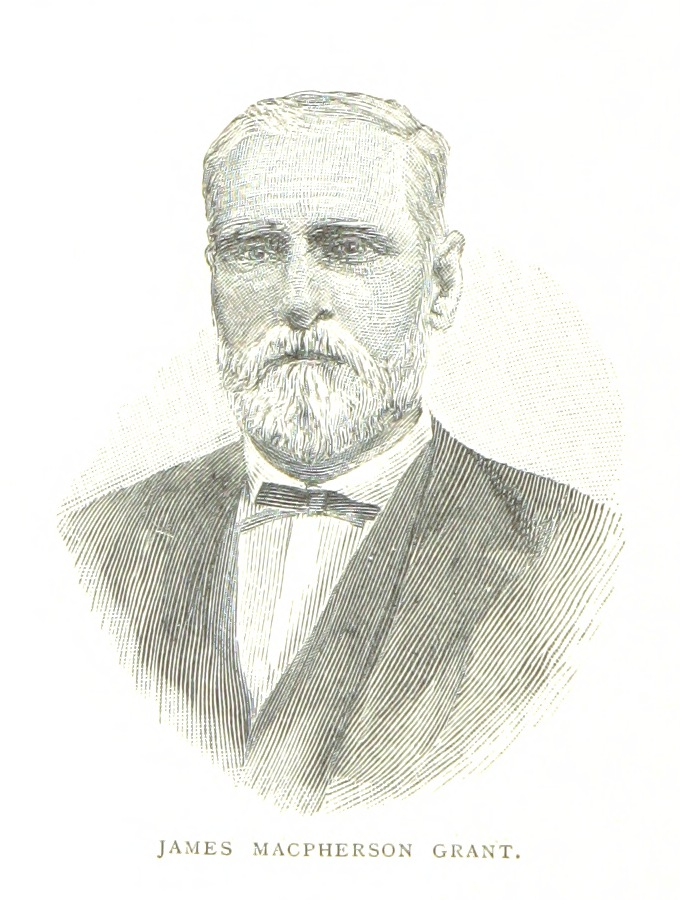
	First party	Second party
Leader	James Francis	James Grant
Party	Constitutionalist	Liberal
Leader's seat	Richmond	Avoca
Seats won	31	37
Percentage	27.47	24.8
Premier before election
James Francis
Constitutionalist
Elected Premier
James Francis
Constitutionalist

The 1874 Victorian colonial election was held from 25 March to 22 April 1874 to elect the 8th Parliament of Victoria. All 78 seats in 49 electorates in the Legislative Assembly were up for election, though eleven seats were uncontested.

There were 24 single-member, 21 two-member and 4 three-member electorates.

The Premier James Francis fought the 1874 general election on a proposition for constitutional reform to settle disputes between the Legislative Assembly and the Legislative Council by joint sittings. After the inconclusive election results became known, the editorial in The Argus commented: "In no one case does it appear that the proposed scheme of constitutional reform exercised any material effect upon the decision of the constituencies". Although Francis continued as Premier after the election, the results precluded any prospect of passing the constitutional reform he had advocated.

== Results ==
With no formal party structure, elected members were mainly classified as 'Ministerial', 'Opposition' or 'Doubtful', with unelected candidates given no classification. 'Ministerial' members were considered to be supporters of the government of the previous parliament, 'Opposition' members were those "opposed to the Government either on general grounds or on the special reform proposition". Those members whose views were unknown were classified as 'Doubtful'.

Legislative Assembly (FPTP)
Party / Grouping	Votes	%	Swing	Seats	Change
Ministerial	34,672	27.47		31	
Opposition	31,307	24.8		37	
Doubtful	7,012	5.55		8	
Liberal	4,792	3.8		2	
Constitutional	2,526	2.0		0	
Unclassified	45,922	36.38		0	
Totals	126,231			78	

== Aftermath ==
After early attempts at passing a reform bill failed, Francis resigned in late July 1874 due to a serious bout of pleurisy. He was succeeded as Premier by the Attorney-General George Kerferd, who accepted that constitutional reform in the existing parliament would not be possible. Kerferd made only one change to the ministry, with James Service replacing Edward Langton as treasurer. The Local Government Act was passed in December 1874, but very little else was achieved due to continual political obstruction.

In late July 1875 the government's budget was carried in the parliament by a just single vote. In response Kerferd requested a dissolution, which was refused by the Acting-Governor, Sir William Stawell, prompting the resignation of Kerferd and his ministry. The liberal politician, Graham Berry, then met with the acting-governor and undertook to form a ministry. As Premier, Berry also took on the role of treasurer. He submitted a protectionist budget to the Legislative Assembly in September 1875, a significant part of which was a land tax. However Berry lacked a majority in parliament after a moderate liberal faction led by James McCulloch had refused to join his ministry.

Berry's revenue-raising land tax proposal provoked a political backlash. In October McCulloch's faction joined with Kerferd's supporters to carry a resolution for more general direct taxation measures. Berry responded to the defeat in parliament by requesting that the acting-governor grant a dissolution, but Stawell again refused the request. Berry resigned and McCulloch, who had been Premier on three previous occasions, returned to office. McCulloch then brought in a budget with generalised taxation features, without singling out the landholding class. Berry's subsequent attempts to block supply were to no avail, and McCulloch's ministry remained in office until the May 1877 elections. By means of political agitation and mass meetings, Berry consolidated his leadership of a radical opposition by polarising the parliament and branding McCulloch a reactionary. His land tax proposal became the central plank of his liberal protectionist movement to contest the election in 1877.

== See also ==
- Members of the Victorian Legislative Assembly, 1874–1877
