= 1883 Victorian colonial election =

← 1880 (July)	22 February 1883	1886 →

All 86 seats in the Victorian Legislative Assembly 44 seats needed for a majority
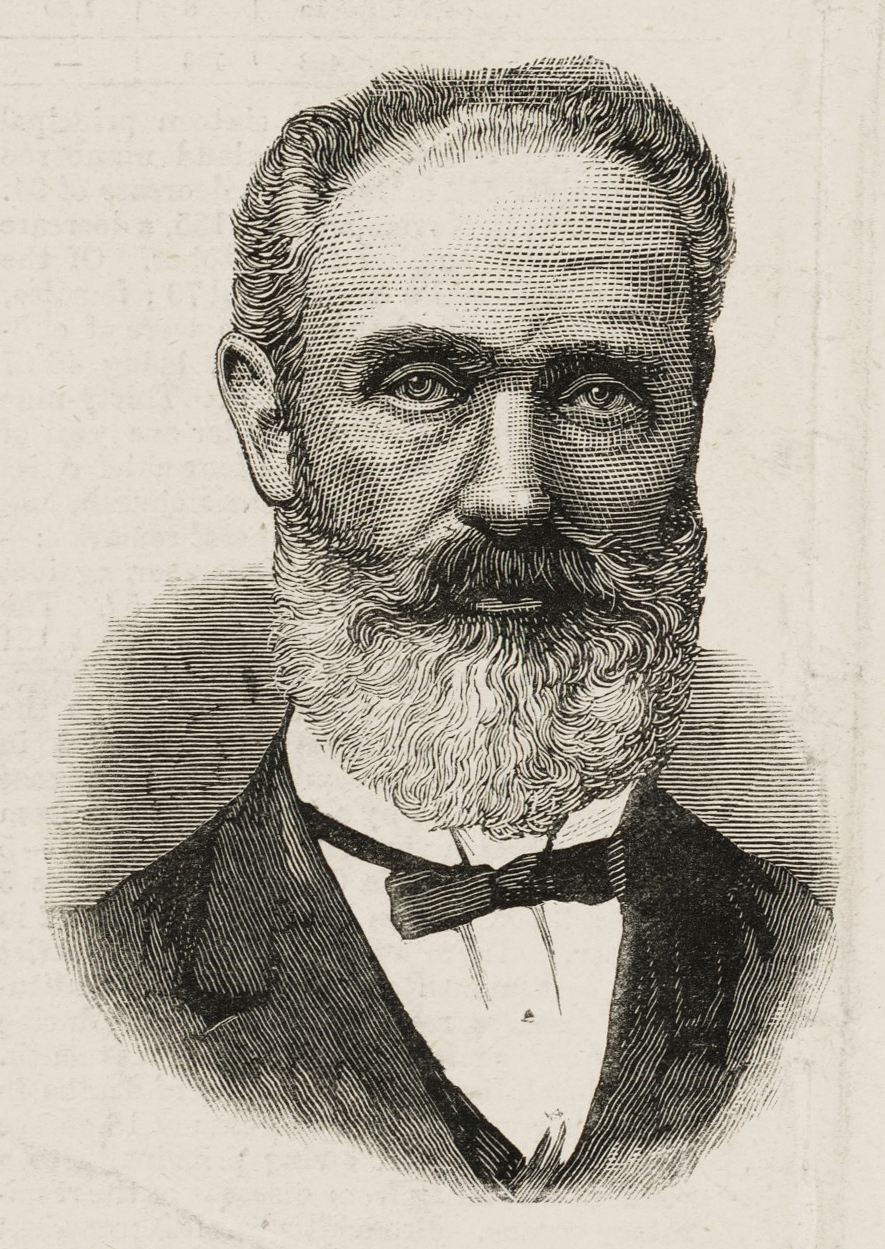

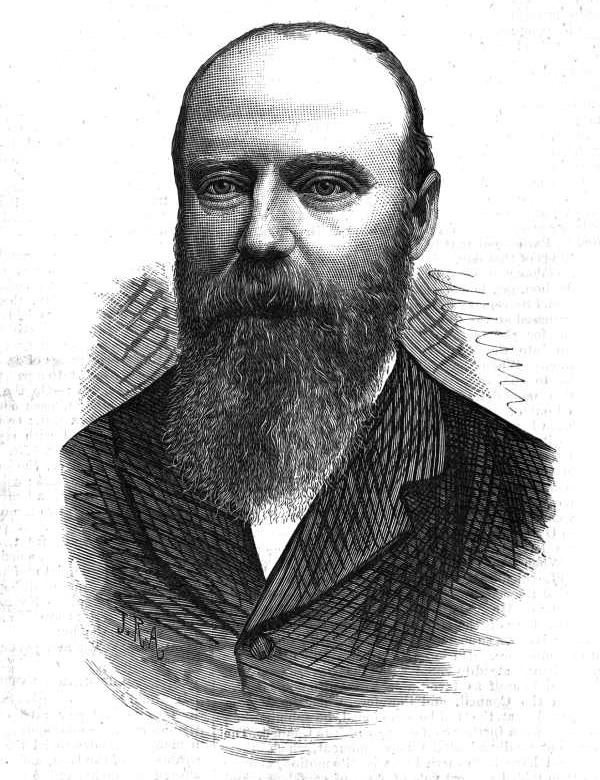
	First party	Second party
Leader	James Service	Bryan O'Loghlen
Party	Liberal-Conservative coalition	Liberal-Conservative coalition
Leader's seat	Castlemaine	West Bourke
Seats won	31	19
Percentage	28.13	18.49
Premier before election
Bryan O'Loghlen
Liberal-Conservative coalition
Elected Premier
James Service
Liberal-Conservative coalition

The 1883 Victorian colonial election was held on 22 February 1883 to elect the 12th Parliament of Victoria. All 86 seats in 55 electorates in the Legislative Assembly were up for election, though twelve seats were uncontested.

There were 31 single-member, 20 two-member and 5 three-member electorates.

The government of Sir Bryan O'Loghlen was heavily defeated at the election, with O'Loghlen himself losing his seat. After the election, with none of the political groupings having an outright majority, a government was formed on 8 March 1883 by a coalition led by James Service (taking the positions of Premier, Treasurer and Minister of Public Instruction), and Graham Berry (as Chief Secretary and Postmaster-General). The coalition represented a joining of moderate conservatives (led by Service) and moderate liberals (led by Berry).

== Results ==
Legislative Assembly (FPTP)
Party / Grouping	Votes	%	Swing	Seats	Change
Liberal (Berry faction)	98,121	50.24		35	
Conservative	54,940	28.13		31	
Liberal (O'Loghlen faction)	36,119	18.49		19	
Independent	6,135	3.14		1	
Totals	195,315			86	

== Aftermath ==
O'Loghlen's tenure as Premier prior to the 1883 election had been, as later described in the Adelaide Observer, a period of "muddle and confusion". It was "by general consent" and a longing "for peace and progress" that, after the election, the political factions led by James Service and Graham Berry joined forces to form a coalition of moderate conservatives and moderate liberals. The new Government ushered in a period of "political peace and material progress" for the colony, providing stability during a period of economic growth in Victoria.

Under the Premier and Treasurer, James Service, the government passed important legislation. An early priority was reforms to eliminate political patronage in the civil service and railways. The Public Services Act and the Railways Management Act, passed in 1883, enabled the establishment of the Public Service Board and the Railways Commission. During its term the parliament also passed the Factories and Shops Act, legalised trade unions and the eight hours' day and introduced important land legislation, as well as clearing a backlog of long-delayed bills. Towards the end of the term of the Service-Berry coalition government, Melbourne's The Age newspaper commented that "no Parliament can show a more imposing record of measures of great public utility".

During 1885 Service decided he would retire as Premier. He resigned on 18 February 1886 and was replaced by fellow-Conservative, Duncan Gillies, less than three weeks before a general election. Berry, the Liberal leader in the coalition, also resigned before the 1886 election, after which he was appointed as the Victorian Agent-General in London. He was replaced in the coalition by fellow-Liberal Alfred Deakin.

== See also ==
- Members of the Victorian Legislative Assembly, 1883–1886
