= 1886 Victorian colonial election =

← 1883	5 March 1886	1889 →

All 86 seats in the Victorian Legislative Assembly 44 seats needed for a majority
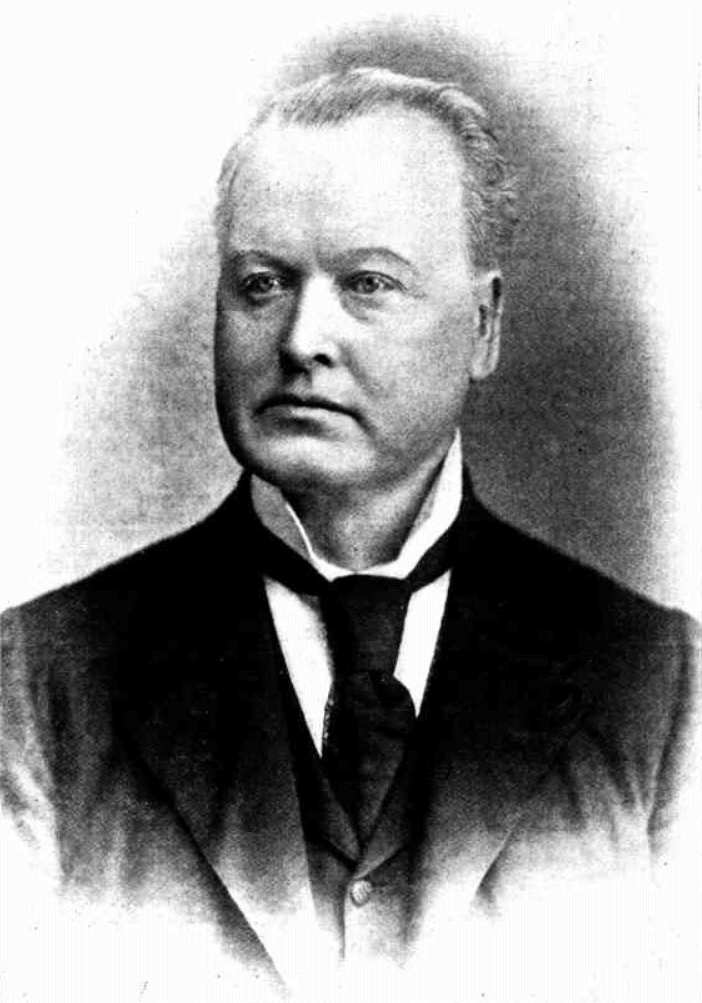

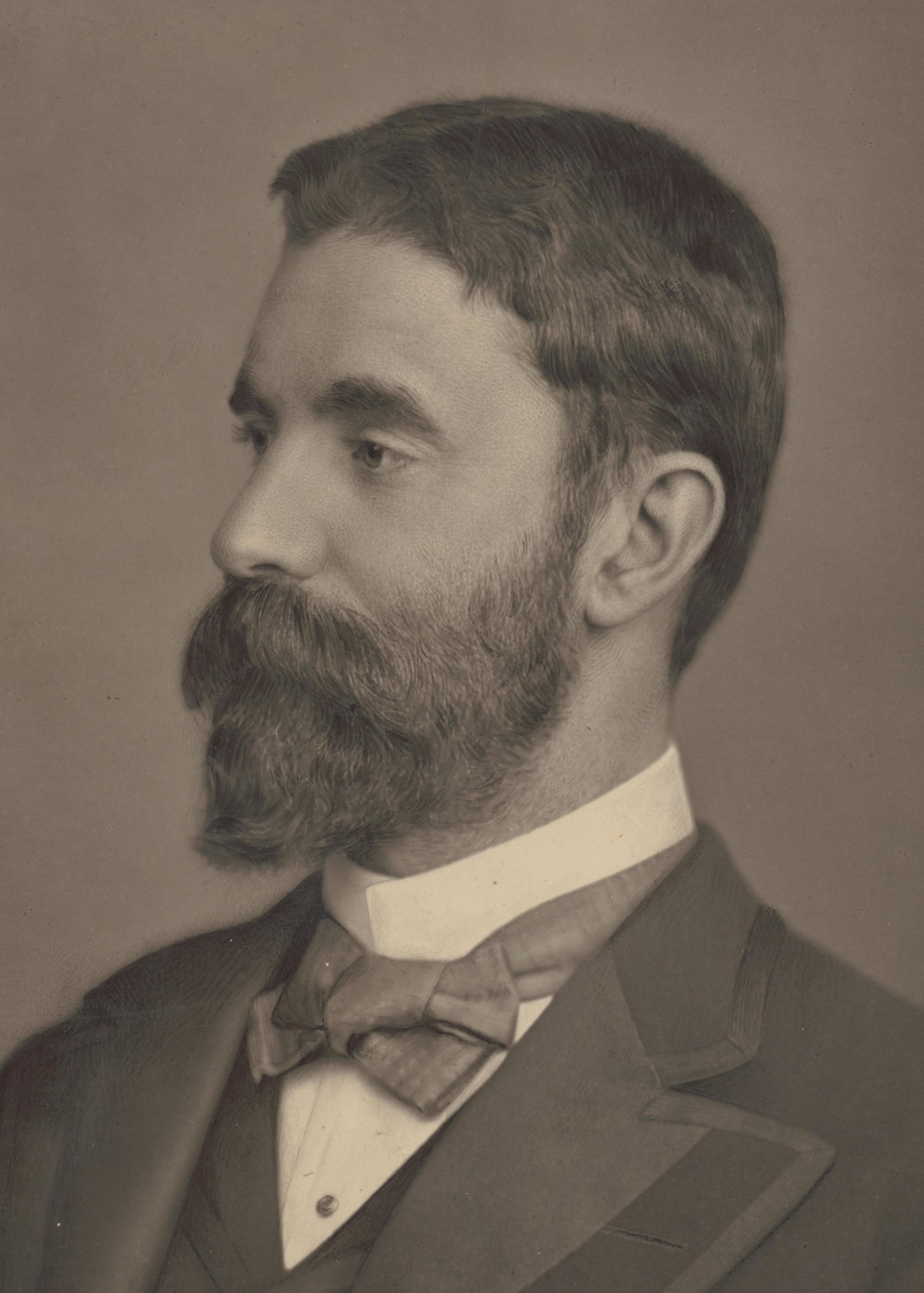
	First party	Second party
Leader	Duncan Gillies	Alfred Deakin
Party	Conservative	Liberal
Leader's seat	Rodney	West Bourke
Seats won	28	38
Percentage	29.86	39.33
Premier before election
Duncan Gillies
Liberal-Conservative coalition
Elected Premier
Duncan Gillies
Liberal-Conservative coalition

The 1886 Victorian colonial election was held on 22 February 1883 to elect the 13th Parliament of Victoria. All 86 seats in 55 electorates in the Legislative Assembly were up for election, though eleven seats were uncontested.

There were 31 single-member, 20 two-member and 5 three-member electorates.

In early 1886 both James Service and Graham Berry had resigned as the Conservative and Liberal leaders in the coalition government. A new ministry was then elected on the eve of the election, which included the Conservative politician Duncan Gillies as Premier, Treasurer and Minister of Railways and the new leader of the Liberals, Alfred Deakin, as Chief Secretary and Minister of Water Supply. In a widely expected result, the Conservative-Liberal coalition won the majority of seats in the new Parliament.

== Results ==
Legislative Assembly (FPTP)
Party / Grouping	Votes	%	Swing	Seats	Change
Liberal	82,318	39.33		38	
Conservative	62,485	29.86		28	
Liberal (Opposition)	32,469	15.51		9	
Conservative (Opposition)	6,852	3.27		6	
Independent	25,169	12.03		5	
Totals	209,293			86	

== Aftermath ==
An early priority for the new Gillies-Deakin administration was irrigation reform, responding to calls for government intervention to fund large-scale irrigation schemes. The Irrigation Act of 1886 led to the possibility of the development of major works, prevented the further private acquisition of riparian rights and declared all surface water in Victoria to be the property of the Crown. In 1887 Deakin was the principal representative for Victoria at the Colonial Conference in London.

After the years of rising prosperity prior to the 1886 election, Victoria's favourable reputation in London led to an influx of capital and increased immigration. Melbourne's population expanded, leading to pressures for land and housing and the extension of the suburban railway network. The resulting land speculation and building boom developed to such an extent that the orthodox banking system began to be compromised, with a large amount of speculative capital from Britain aggravating the problem. The land and building boom was encouraged by the government and compounded by Gillies' overconfidence and financial incompetence in his role as Premier and Treasurer. As land and property values in Melbourne escalated and the financial system became inceasingly corrupted, the government was loath to introduce regulations or meaningful reforms that might compromise the booming economy, nor did it make any attempt to protect investors against unsound or unscrupulous financial schemes.

== See also ==
- Members of the Victorian Legislative Assembly, 1886–1889
