= 1877 Victorian colonial election =

← 1874	11 May 1877	1880 (Feb) →

All 86 seats in the Victorian Legislative Assembly 44 seats needed for a majority
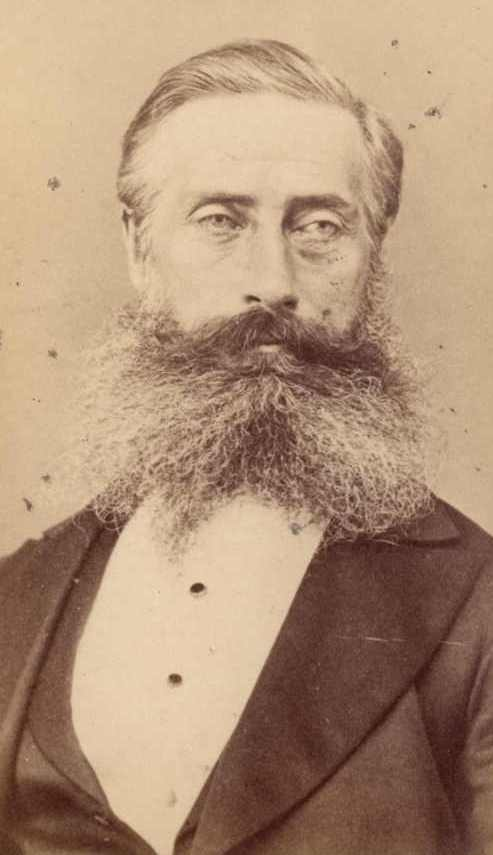

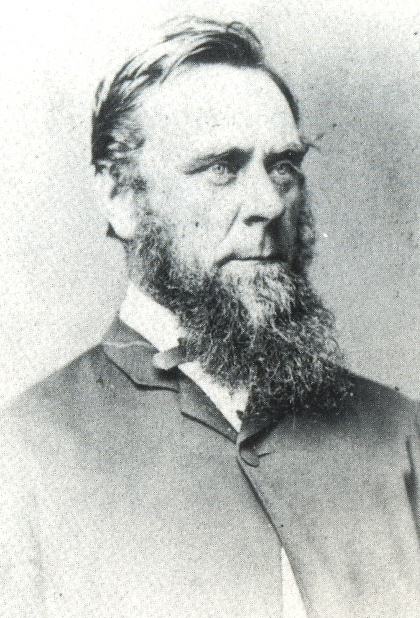
	First party	Second party
Leader	Graham Berry	Sir James McCulloch
Party	Liberal (Protectionist)	Conservative (Free Trade)
Leader's seat	Geelong	Warrnambool
Seats won	56	14
Percentage	51.46	23.75
Premier before election
Sir James McCulloch
Conservative
Elected Premier
Graham Berry
Liberal

The 1877 Victorian colonial election was held on 11 May 1877 to elect the 9th Parliament of Victoria. It was the first election in Victoria in which all electorates voted on the same day. All 86 seats in 55 electorates in the Legislative Assembly were up for election, though four seats were uncontested.

There were 31 single-member, 20 two-member and 5 three-member electorates.

The conservative (or free trade) government of Sir James McCulloch was heavily defeated by the liberal (or protectionist) opposition led by Graham Berry, who formed a new government on May 21.

== Results ==
Legislative Assembly (FPTP)
Party	Votes	%	Swing	Seats	Change
Liberal (Protectionist)	93,557	51.46		56	
Conservative (Free Trade)	43,168	23.75		14	
Independent	41,295	22.72		15	
Doubtful	3,771	2.07		1	
Totals	181,791			86	

== Aftermath ==
After McCulloch's crushing defeat he retired from politics without returning to parliament. He resigned from the seat of Warrnambool in May 1878. After McCulloch's retirement, James Service emerged as the leader of the numerically depleted Opposition. Service's politics were more of a pragmatic and constitutionalist nature.

This term of government was dominated by Berry's struggle with the Legislative Council after that body rejected an appropriations bill in December 1877. On 8 January 1878 ('Black Wednesday') Berry responded by dismissing large numbers of public servants and judges in an effort to discredit the council. A compromise was reached in April, which left the council's powers intact. Berry left for Britain in December 1878 in an effort to persuade the Colonial Office to reform the Legislative Council. However, his efforts at constitutional reform were inconclusive and he returned to Melbourne after six months to face divisions in his party as well as a general economic depression (dubbed the 'Berry Blight') for which his opponents held him responsible.

== See also ==
- Members of the Victorian Legislative Assembly, 1877–1880
