= 1894 Victorian colonial election =

- 20 September 1894

All 95 seats in the Victorian Legislative Assembly 48 seats needed for a majority
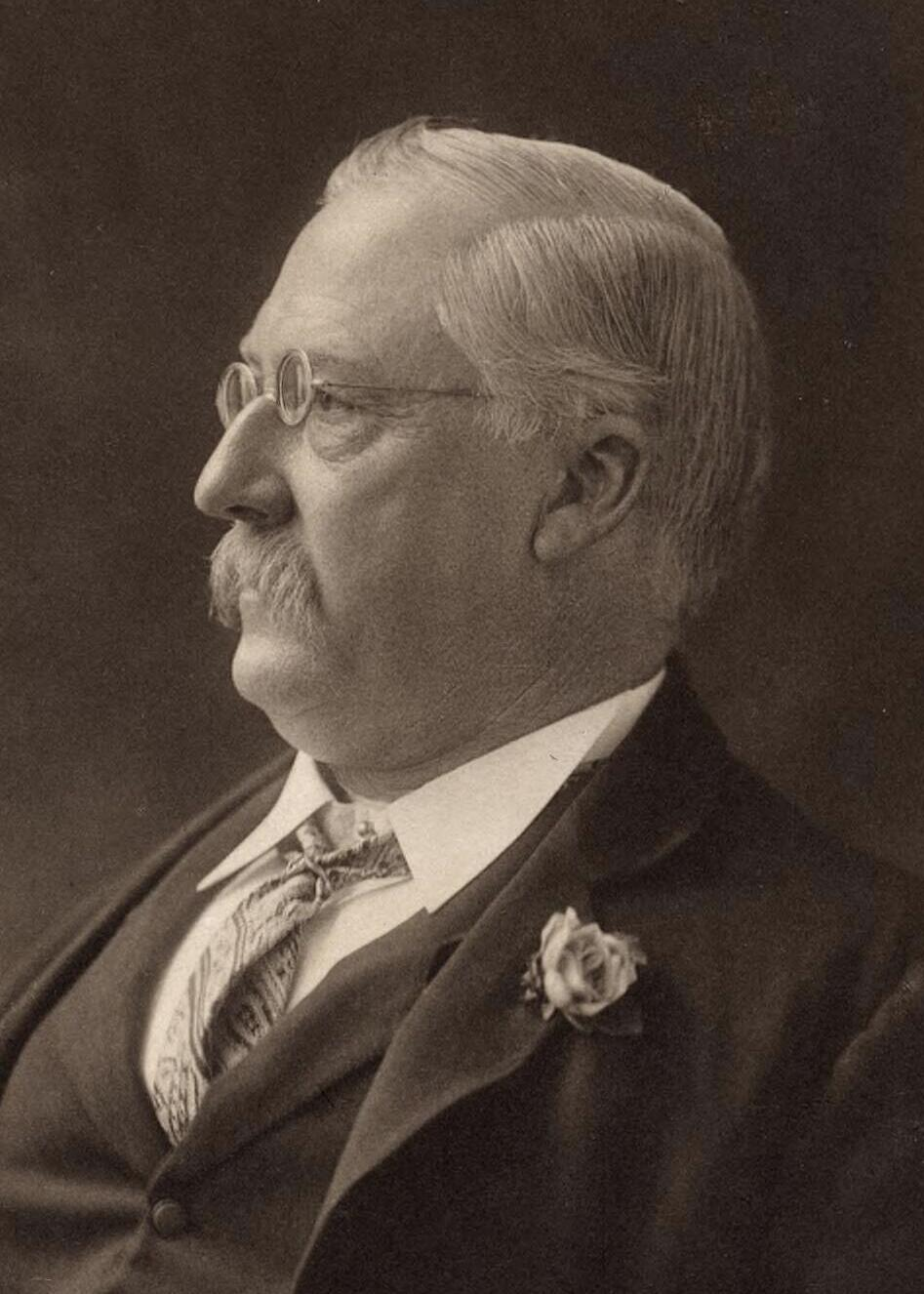

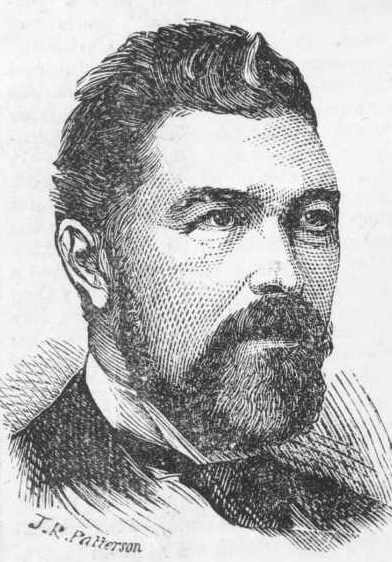
	First party	Second party
Leader	George Turner	James Patterson
Party	Liberal	Conservative
Leader's seat	St Kilda	Castlemaine
Last election	56 seats	28 seats
Seats won	47	27
Seat change	▼9	▼1
Premier before election
James Patterson
Conservative
Elected Premier
George Turner
Liberal

The 1894 Victorian colonial election was held on 20 September 1894 to elect the 16th Parliament of Victoria. All 95 seats in the Legislative Assembly were up for election, though 16 were uncontested.

== Background ==
The Electoral Act Amendment Act of 1888 had increased the number seats in the Legislative Assembly from 86 to 95, and the number of electoral districts from 55 to 84 (73 single-member electorates, 11 two-member electorates). Plural voting was permitted for people who had property in more than one electorate.

The Liberals were split between Oppositionists, led by George Turner, and Ministerialists, led by Conservative Premier James Patterson.

Enrolments in most seats was lower than at the 1892 election, as a result of the Purification of the Rolls Act of 1891. It had the effect of disenfranchising large numbers of voters, mostly the working class, who had changed their residence in the year before the election.

== Results ==
Legislative Assembly (FPTP)
Party	Votes	%	Swing	Seats	Change
Liberal Oppositionists	75,404	46.03		47	▼9
Conservative Ministerialists	44,479	27.15		27	▼1
United Labour and Liberal	32,474	19.82		18	▲9
Liberal Ministerialists	11,448	6.99		3	
Formal votes	163,805				
Informal votes	754				
Total	164,559			95	
Registered voters / turnout	234,552	70.85			
