= 1871 Victorian colonial election =

- 14 February to 16 March 1871

All 78 seats in the Victorian Legislative Assembly 40 seats needed for a majority
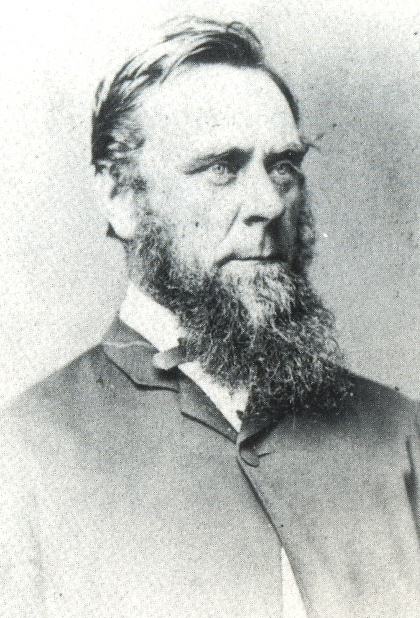

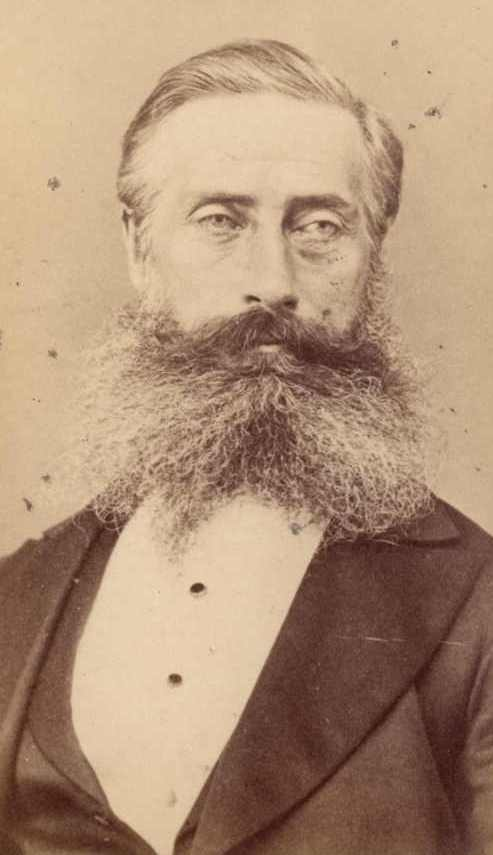
	First party	Second party
Leader	James McCulloch	Graham Berry
Party	Moderate Liberal	Liberal
Leader's seat	Mornington	Geelong West
Seats won	20	27
Percentage	18.41	38.33
Premier before election
James McCulloch
Liberal
Elected Premier
James McCulloch
Liberal

The 1871 Victorian colonial election was held from 14 February to 16 March 1871 to elect the 7th parliament of Victoria. All 78 seats in 49 electorates in the Legislative Assembly were up for election, though six seats were uncontested.

There were 24 single-member, 21 two-member and 4 three-member electorates.

At the 1871 election the central issue put forward to electors by the Premier James McCulloch was a proposal to introduce a secular education bill. After the election the new parliament was overwhelmingly liberal. An analysis of the results in The Age newspaper estimated that 49 members were "Liberals of all classes", compared to 29 "Non-Liberals", although the tally was further complicated by the Liberal grouping being split into members and supporters of James McCulloch's ministry and those deemed "Liberal Anti-Ministerialists". Even though the elected Constitutionalists were likely to support McCulloch's ministry, The Age concluded that the Liberals opposed to the government still had a majority of eight seats in the parliament.

== Results ==
Legislative Assembly (FPTP)
Party / Grouping	Votes	%	Swing	Seats	Change
Ministerial	23,462	18.41		20	
Liberal (Opposition)	48,839	38.33		27	
Constitutional	36,611	28.73		24	
Opposition	1,071	0.84		2	
Conservative	unopposed	N/A		3	
Unclassified	17,449	13.69		2	
Totals	127,432			78	

== Aftermath ==
In June 1871 McCulloch and his Treasurer, James Francis attempted to introduce a property tax as a means of financing new government responsibilities, a proposal which was overwhelmingly defeated in the Legislative Assembly. McCulloch tendered the resignation of his ministry to the Governor "in consequence of the adverse vote". The Governor then called upon Charles Duffy, as the leader of the conservative free-trade faction opposing McCulloch's property tax, to form a government.

Lacking a parliamentary majority, Duffy put aside his free-trade convictions to enter into an uneasy alliance with a faction of protectionist liberals led by Graham Berry. The new ministry included Duffy as Premier and Postmaster-General, with Berry taking the roles of Treasurer and Commissioner of Customs. To raise additional revenue the government increased tariffs, an indication of the protectionist disposition of the new ministry. Duffy's premiership drew attention to his Irish Catholic nationalism, leading to considerable sectarian hostility after he was accused of favouring Catholics in government appointments. In May 1872 a motion was debated in the Legislative Assembly concerning Duffy's appointment of the Irish journalist John Cashel Hoey to the position of Secretary to the Victorian Agent-General's Office in London. On 29 May, after a debate over six days, the motion condemning the improper exercise of patronage was voted upon, which was lost by the government 34 to 39. Duffy requested a dissolution of parliament, which was refused by the Governor, after which Duffy and his ministers resigned. The Governor then invited James Francis to form a new ministry, as the leading figure of the parliamentary opposition after McCulloch resigned his seat in March 1872.

Francis' pragmatic and disciplined leadership style managed to hold together a cabinet of experienced ministers, some who had previously been bitter opponents. His government passed the Education Act 1872 (36 Vict. No. 447) which provided for free, secular and compulsory primary education in Victoria (the first such legislation in Australia). Legislation was passed to reduce mining accidents and implement a long-delayed railway building programme. The Francis ministry also passed laws dealing with land-related issues such as fencing, impounding and mining on private property. Francis fought the 1874 general election on a proposition for constitutional reform to settle disputes between the Legislative Assembly and the Legislative Council by joint sittings.

== See also ==
- Members of the Victorian Legislative Assembly, 1871–1874
