= February 1880 Victorian colonial election =

| ← 1877 | 28 February 1880 | 1880 (July) → |

All 86 seats in the Victorian Legislative Assembly 44 seats needed for a majority
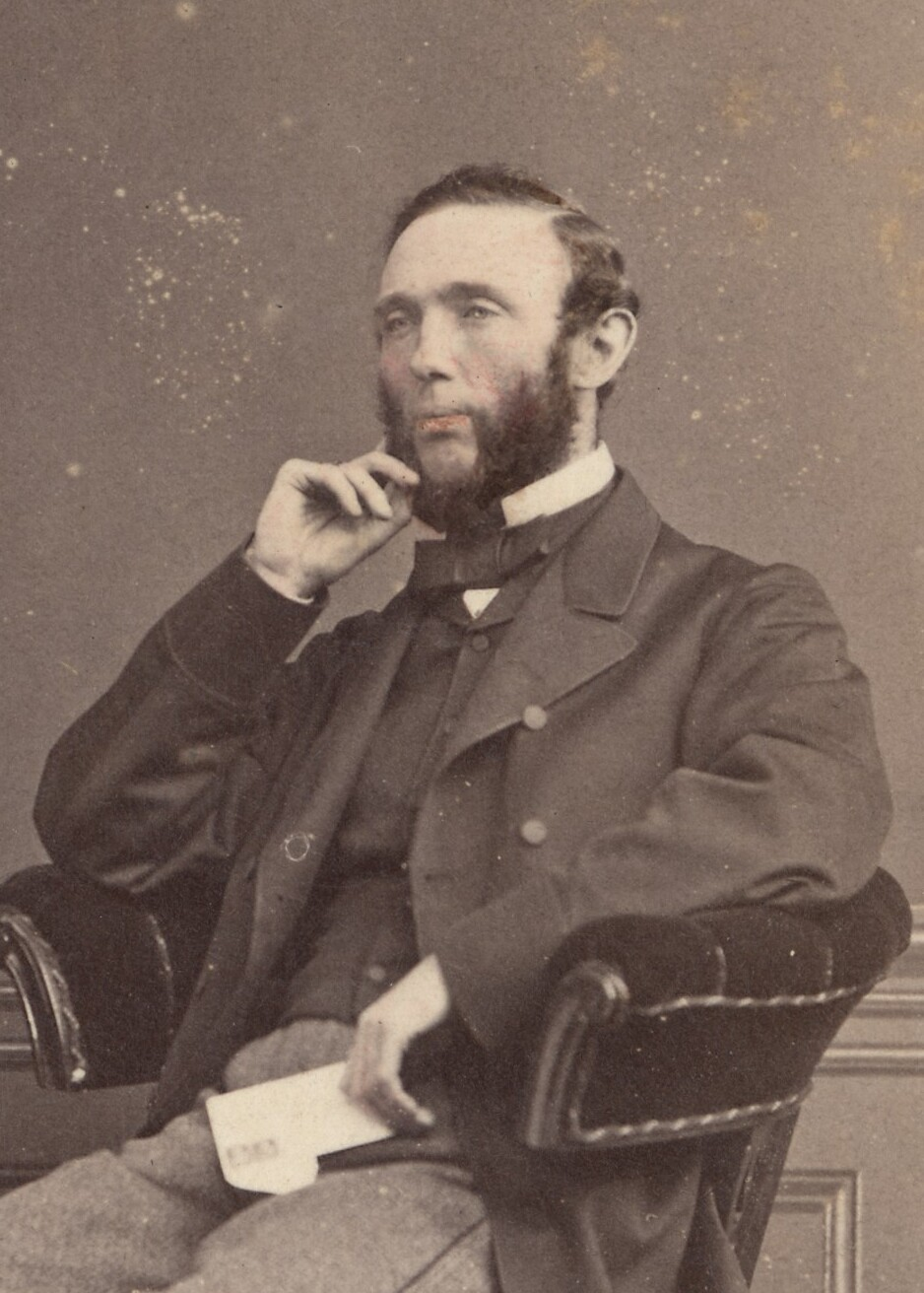

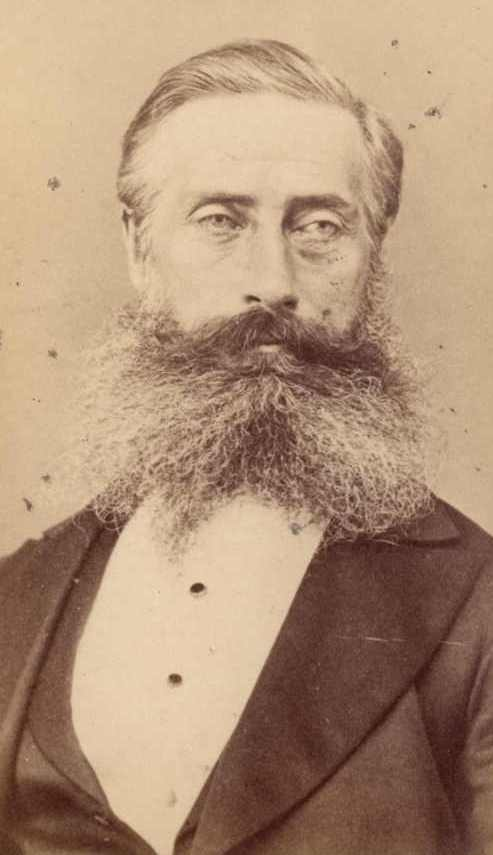
| | First party | Second party |
|---|---|---|
| Leader | James Service | Graham Berry |
| Party | Constitutionalist | Liberal (Protectionist) |
| Leader's seat | Maldon | Geelong |
| Seats won | 49 | 34 |
| Percentage | 50.29 | 45.66 |
Premier before election
Graham Berry
Liberal
Elected Premier
James Service
Constitutionalist

The February 1880 Victorian colonial election was held on 28 February 1880 to elect the 10th Parliament of Victoria. All 86 seats in 55 electorates in the Legislative Assembly were up for election, though two seats were uncontested.

There were 31 single-member, 20 two-member and 5 three-member electorates.

The liberal (or protectionist) government of Graham Berry was narrowly defeated by the Constitutionalist (moderate liberal) opposition led by James Service, who formed a new government on March 5.

== Results ==
Legislative Assembly (FPTP)
| Party | Votes | % | Swing | Seats | Change |
|---|---|---|---|---|---|
| Constitutionalist | 111,395 | 50.29 | | 49 | |
| Liberal (Protectionist) | 101,146 | 45.66 | | 34 | |
| Independent | 8,984 | 4.06 | | 3 | |
| Totals | 221,525 | | | 86 | |

== Aftermath ==
Although James Service won the February 1880 election with a workable majority, he remained Premier for only six months after an unsuccessful attempt to reform the Legislative Council. The Service Reform Bill provided for a wider Legislative Council franchise and a double dissolution if the Council twice rejected a bill passed by the Assembly in two consecutive sessions (followed by a joint sitting of the Houses). In June 1880 a motion for the second reading of the reform bill in the Legislative Assembly was lost by two votes, after which Service was granted a dissolution in the full confidence he would win the subsequent election.

== See also ==
- Members of the Victorian Legislative Assembly, 1880–1883
