= July 1880 Victorian colonial election =

← 1880 (Feb)	14 July 1880	1883 →

All 86 seats in the Victorian Legislative Assembly 44 seats needed for a majority
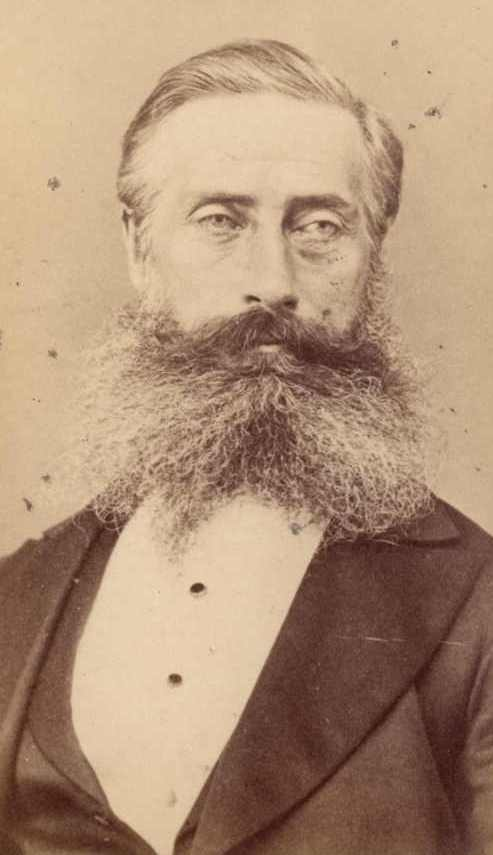

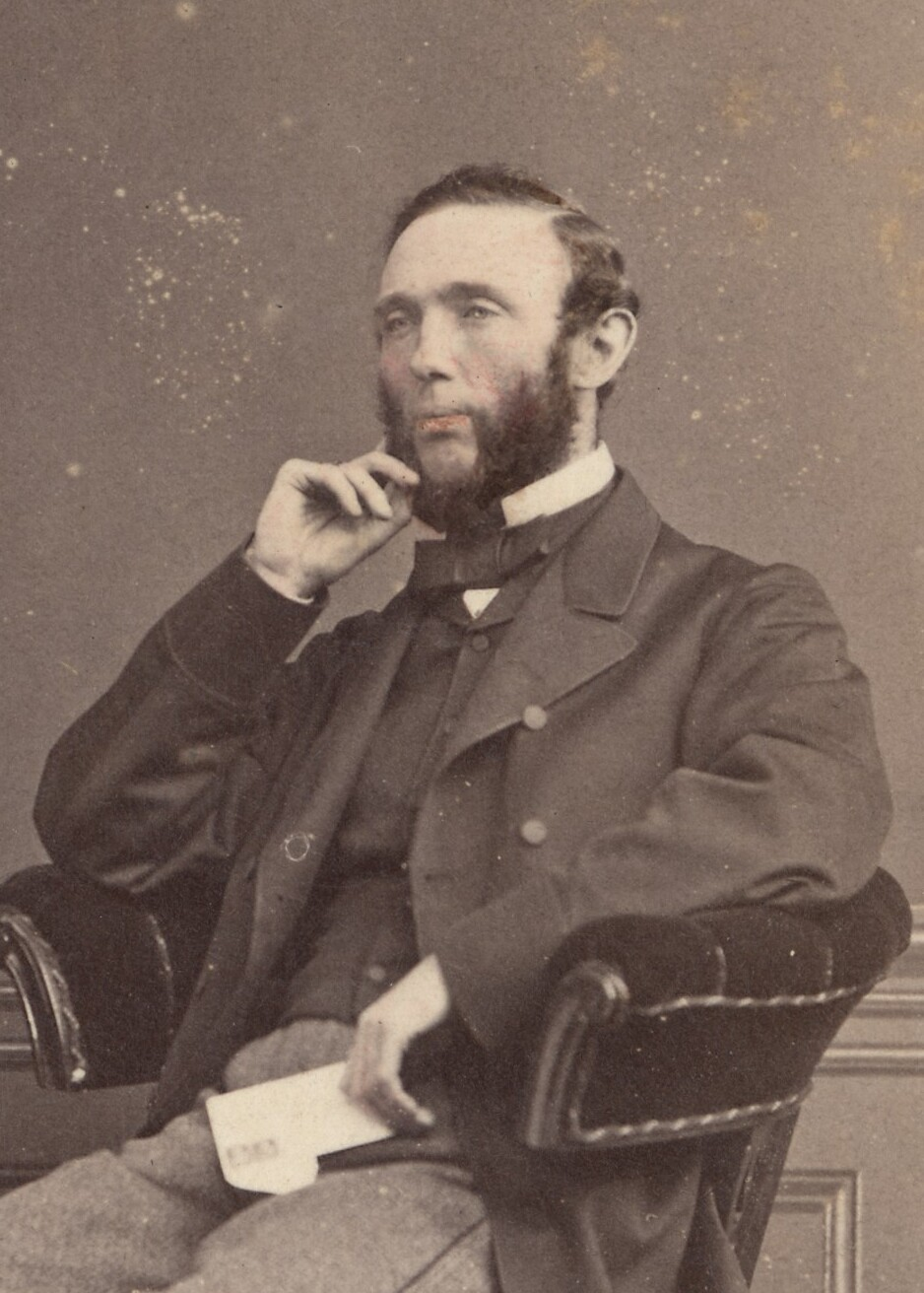
	First party	Second party
Leader	Graham Berry	James Service
Party	Liberal (Protectionist)	Constitutionalist
Leader's seat	Geelong	Maldon
Seats won	49	35
Percentage	53.93	45.31
Premier before election
James Service
Constitutionalist
Elected Premier
Graham Berry
Liberal

The July 1880 Victorian colonial election was held on 14 July 1880 to elect the 11th Parliament of Victoria. All 86 seats in 55 electorates in the Legislative Assembly were up for election, though eight seats were uncontested.

There were 31 single-member, 20 two-member and 5 three-member electorates.

The Constitutionalist (moderate liberal) government of James Service was defeated by the liberal (or protectionist) opposition led by Graham Berry, who formed a new government on 3 August 1880.

== Results ==
Legislative Assembly (FPTP)
Party / Grouping	Votes	%	Swing	Seats	Change
Liberal (Protectionist)	113,755	53.93		49	
Constitutionalist	95,586	45.31		35	
Independent	1,606	0.76		2	
Totals	210,947			86	

== Aftermath ==
Berry's new cabinet was more moderate than his previous one. A new bill to reform the Legislative Council, despite the abandonment of provisions for resolving deadlocks which had been the cause of previous difficulties, was still unable to be passed when the council refused to accept the lowering of property qualifications. Berry's position as premier became increasingly tenuous as he faced opposition from parliamentary conservatives, advocates of concessions for Catholic education and malcontents in his own party opposed to his moderate stance on upper house reform.

In late June 1881 Bryan O'Loghlen moved a motion of no confidence in Berry's government. O'Loghlen, a liberal with a devotion to Irish-Catholic causes, had been appointed attorney-general in Berry's cabinet in 1878 and had been the acting premier from December 1878 to June 1879 during Berry's absence in London. After the July 1880 election he declined a position in Berry's cabinet when his advocacy of educational concessions for Catholics was rejected. After days of debate, on 1 July 1881 the censure initiated by O'Loghlen was carried by 41 votes to 38 with support from the conservative opposition. The Victorian Governor refused Berry's request to dissolve parliament and invited O'Loghlen to form a government. His cabinet was announced on July 10, seven members of which had been members of the opposition. O'Loghlen himself took on the roles of premier, attorney-general and treasurer.

O'Loghlen's ministry lacked a majority in the parliament, but was kept in office with conservative support. By the time of the parliamentary break at the end of 1882 considerable discontent had arisen at O'Loghlen's conduct in regard to a major overseas loan to finance a railway programme. In late January 1883, anticipating a censure motion when parliament resumed, O'Loghlen was granted a dissolution of parliament.

== See also ==
- Members of the Victorian Legislative Assembly, 1880–1883
