= 1900 Victorian colonial election =

- 1 November 1900

All 95 seats in the Victorian Legislative Assembly 48 seats needed for a majority
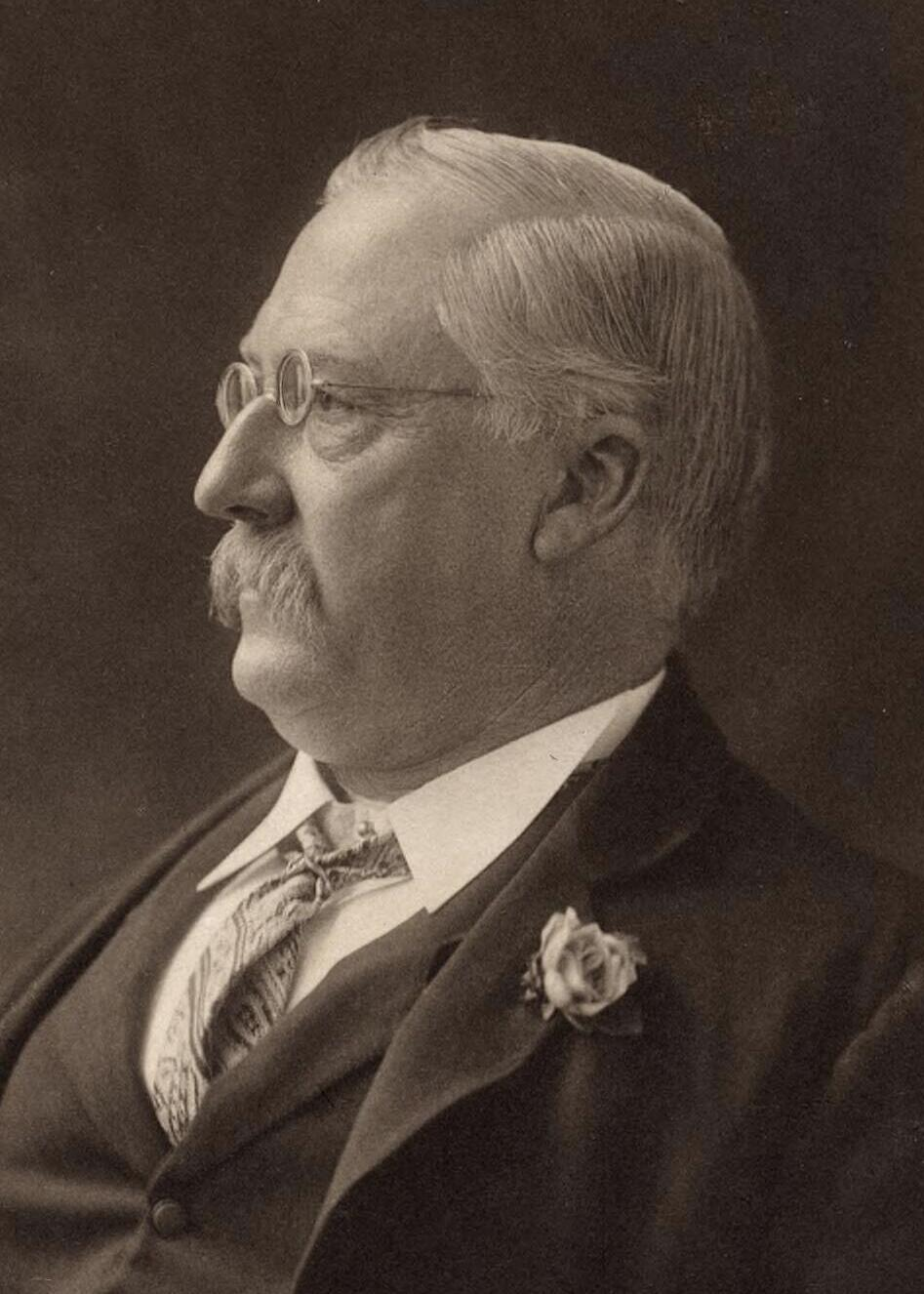

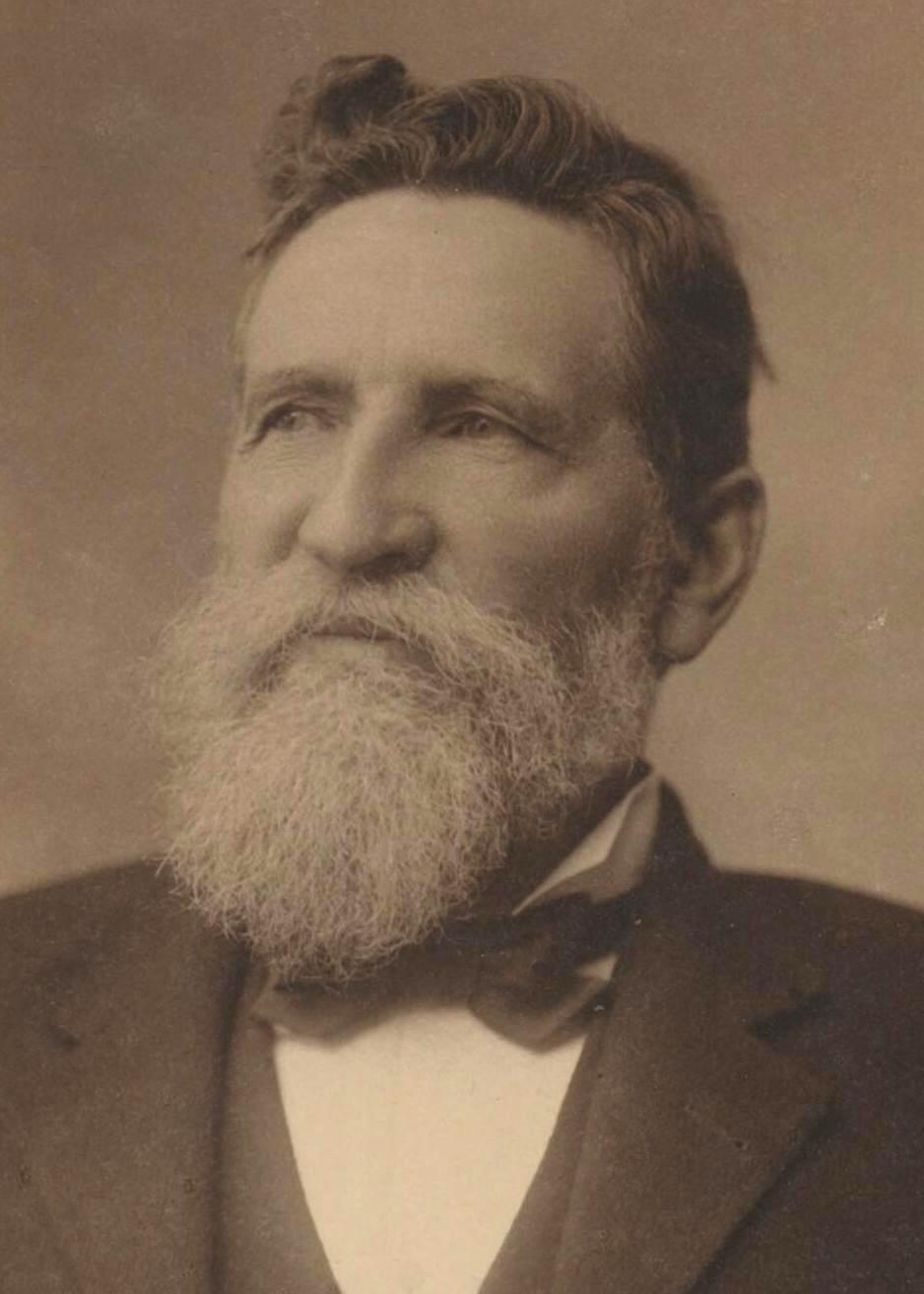
	First party	Second party
Leader	George Turner	Allan McLean
Party	Liberal	Ministerialist
Leader's seat	St Kilda	Gippsland North
Last election	0 (Note: At the 1897 election, the Liberal Ministerialists won 55 seats with 64.39% of the total vote. Additionally, the Oppositionists - which won 32 seats with 24.99% of the vote - were largely made up of Conservatives.)	55
Seats won	44	24
Seat change	▲44	▼31
Premier before election
Allan McLean
Ministerialist
Elected Premier
George Turner
Liberal

The 1900 Victorian colonial election was held on 1 November 1900 to elect the 18th Parliament of Victoria. All 95 seats in the Legislative Assembly were up for election.

The incumbent Ministerialist government, led by Allan McLean, was defeated and a Liberal government was formed with George Turner as Premier. Turner had previously served as premier from 1894 until 1899.

This was the first election in Victoria that used first-past-the-post following the abolition of plural voting. People who lived in one electorate and owned property in another were still able to choose which electorate they voted in.

This was also the last election in Victoria before Australian federation in 1901, when it became a state.

== Results ==
Legislative Assembly (FPTP)
Party	Votes	%	Swing	Seats	Change
Liberal	80,536	50.61	+50.61	44	▲44
Ministerialist	37,048	23.28	−40.41	24	▼31
Conservative	23,596	14.83	−10.16	18	▼14
United Labour	17,952	11.28	+0.84	9	▲1
Formal votes	159,132				
Informal votes	678				
Total	159,810			95	
Registered voters / turnout	280,810	63.41			

=== Albert Park ===
1900 Victorian colonial election: Albert Park
Party	Candidate	Votes	%	±%
Conservative	John White	929	39.1	
Socialist Liberal	Henry Champion	878	36.9	
Ministerialist	Thomas Ashworth	571	24.0	
Total formal votes		2,378	99.98	
Informal votes		4	0.02	
Turnout		2,382	71.4	
Conservative hold		Swing		

=== Anglesey ===
1900 Victorian colonial election: Anglesey
Party	Candidate	Votes	%	±%
Conservative	Malcolm McKenzie	1,514	61.1	
Liberal	James Fenton	963	38.9	
Total formal votes		2,477	99.94	
Informal votes		15	0.06	
Turnout		2,492	63.7	
Conservative hold		Swing		

=== Ararat ===
1900 Victorian colonial election: Ararat
Party	Candidate	Votes	%	±%
Ministerialist	Richard Toutcher	840	64.1	
Liberal	James Styles	470	35.9	
Total formal votes		1,310	99.98	
Informal votes		6	0.02	
Turnout		1,316	58.8	
Ministerial hold		Swing		

=== Ballarat East ===
1900 Victorian colonial election: Ballarat East
Party	Candidate	Votes	%	±%
Liberal	Robert McGregor	1,679	72.3	
Labour	John Meehan	551	24.7	
Total formal votes		2,230	99.98	
Informal votes		5	0.02	
Turnout		2,235	64.8	
Liberal hold		Swing		

=== Ballarat West ===
1900 Victorian colonial election: Ballarat West (Note: Two-member electorate)
Party	Candidate	Votes	%	±%
Ministerialist	Joseph Kirton	2,029	26.6	
Ministerialist	Richard Vale	2,027	26.6	
Liberal	Robert Nicholl	1,495	19.6	
Liberal	James Vallins	1,278	16.8	
Liberal	Frank Bessermeres	797	10.4	
Total formal votes		7,625	100.0	
Informal votes		1	0.0	
Turnout		7,626	69.5	
Ministerial hold		Swing		
Ministerial hold		Swing		

=== Barwon ===
1900 Victorian colonial election: Barwon
Party	Candidate	Votes	%	±%
Conservative	Jonas Levien	923	54.2	
Liberal	Richard Crouch	781	45.8	
Total formal votes		1,704	98.1	1,723
Informal votes		19	1.9	
Turnout		1,723	74.3	
Conservative hold		Swing		

=== Benalla and Yarrawonga ===
1900 Victorian colonial election: Benalla and Yarrawonga
Party	Candidate	Votes	%	±%
Ministerialist	Thomas Kennedy	unopposed		
Ministerial hold		Swing		

=== Benambra ===
1900 Victorian colonial election: Benambra
Party	Candidate	Votes	%	±%
Ministerialist	Albert Craven	unopposed		
Ministerial hold		Swing		

=== Bogong ===
1900 Victorian colonial election: Bogong
Party	Candidate	Votes	%	±%
Liberal	Isaac Isaacs	unopposed		
Liberal hold		Swing		

=== Borung ===
1900 Victorian colonial election: Borung
Party	Candidate	Votes	%	±%
Ministerialist	John Dyer	999	50.3	
Ministerialist	William Hutchinson	988	49.7	
Total formal votes		1,987	99.096	
Informal votes		8	0.04	
Turnout		1,995	69.2	
Ministerialist hold		Swing		

=== Bourke East ===
1900 Victorian colonial election: Bourke East
Party	Candidate	Votes	%	±%
Liberal	Mackay Gair	unopposed		
Liberal hold		Swing		
