= 1897 Victorian colonial election =

- 14 October 1897

All 95 seats in the Victorian Legislative Assembly 48 seats needed for a majority
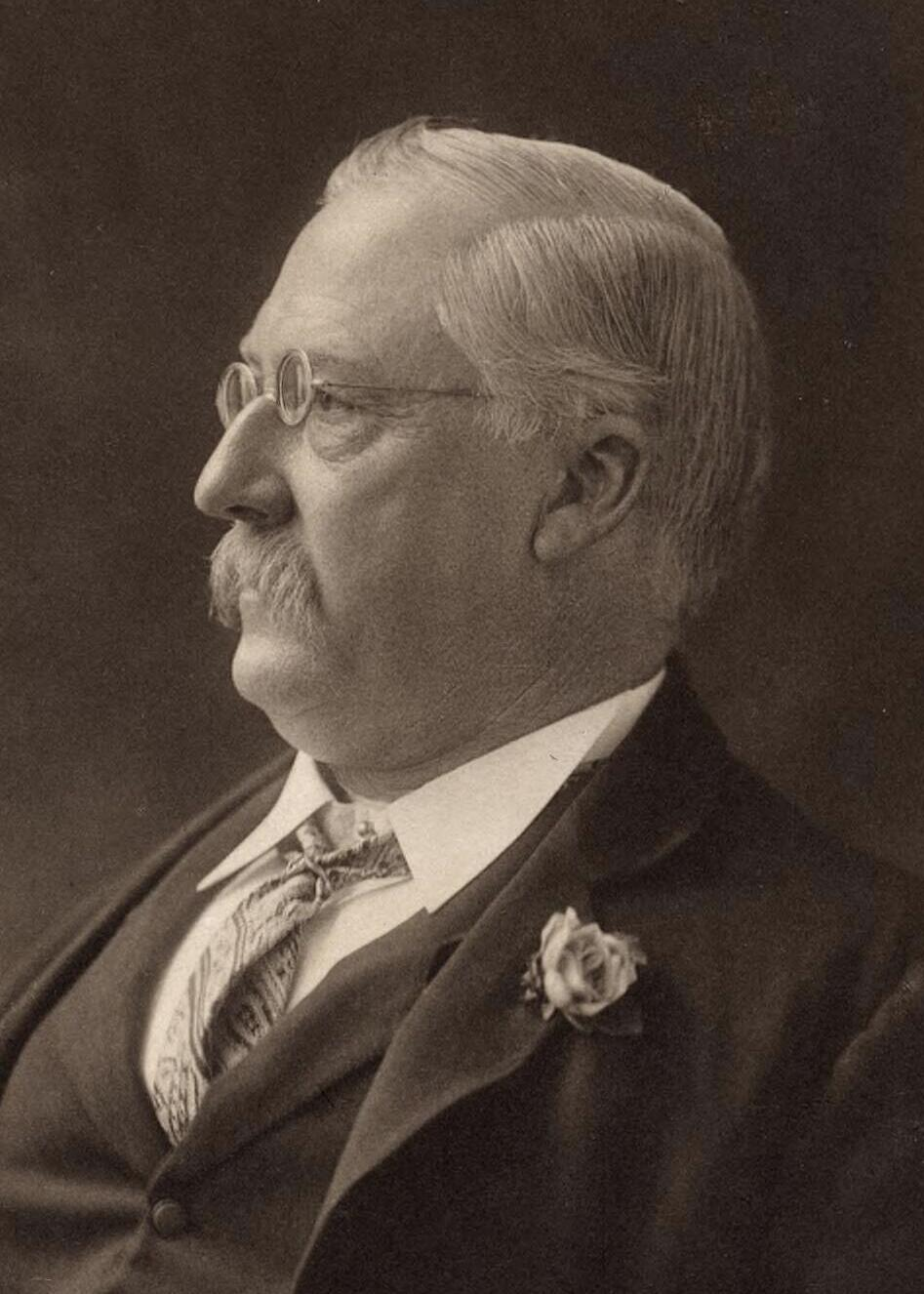

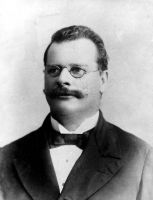
	First party	Second party
Leader	George Turner	William Trenwith
Party	Liberal	United Labour
Leader since	27 September 1894 (de facto)	21 April 1892 (de facto)
Leader's seat	St Kilda	Richmond
Seats won	55	8
Percentage	63.69%	10.44%
Premier before election
George Turner
Liberal
Elected Premier
George Turner
Liberal

The 1897 Victorian colonial election was held on 14 October 1897 to elect the 17th Parliament of Victoria. All 95 seats in the Legislative Assembly were up for election, though 13 were uncontested.

George Turner's Liberal government was returned with an increased majority.

== Background ==
Formal political parties began to evolve out of faction alignments at this election. The Protectionist and Liberal Party was formed to settle disputes between several Liberal candidates standing for the same seats. The Oppositionists at this election were largely made up of Conservative MPs.

The National Party supported Opposition candidates, although the party also endorsed several Ministerialists, including Alfred Deakin.

== Results ==
Legislative Assembly (FPTP)
Party	Votes	%	Swing	Seats	Change
Liberal Ministerialists (Note: Includes Protectionist and Liberal candidates.)	118,237	63.69		55	
Oppositionist	45,711	24.63		32	
United Labour	19,371	10.44		8	
Clerical Party	1,804	0.97	+0.97	0	Steady
Independent	345	0.19		0	
People's Liberal and Independent Labor	152	0.08	+0.08	0	Steady
Formal votes	185,620				
Informal votes	895				
Total	186,455			95	
Registered voters / turnout	254,155	63.41			

== Aftermath ==
In November 1899, Turner lost a vote of confidence when many rural Liberals abandoned him. Allan McLean, the member for Gippsland North, then formed a more conservative administration. The McLean-led Ministerialists lost the 1900 election, and Turner returned to power.
