= Liberals (Victoria, pre-1909) =

Political parties in Victoria, Australia

The Liberal Party, often known simply as the Liberals, was the name used by a number of political groupings and parties in the Victorian Parliament from the late 19th century until around 1917.

Before then, multiple Liberal political groupings were active in the Victorian colonial politics. Since that time, a formal political party structure has emerged.

== History ==
Until federation in 1901, the only major political party active in Victorian state politics was the Labour Party. The main political groupings were the Ministerialists and Oppositionists, which either supported or opposed the government of the day.

The first Victorian Premier to be considered a Liberal was Graham Berry, who took office in 1875. He later led the Liberals to victory at the 1877, February 1880 and July 1880 colonial elections. Berry's electoral victory in 1877 came as leader of the National Reform and Protection League, which historian Sean Scalmer contends was Australia's first mass political party with a parliamentary caucus, local branches, a policy platform, and an early form of candidate preselection. Scalmer describes Berry's party as "a means to prevent the fracturing of the Liberal vote". Berry was succeeded by Bryan O'Loghlen in 1881.

Berry again led the Liberals from 1883 in a coalition government with the Conservatives. He was succeeded as leader by Alfred Deakin in February 1886.

The Liberals held government throughout almost the entire 1890s and early 1900s, led at different times by James Munro (1890–1892), William Shiels (1892–1893), George Turner (1894–1899 and 1900–1901), Allan McLean (1899–1900) and Alexander Peacock (1901–1902).

Despite many similar viewpoints, the Liberals were not a united grouping. For instance, the 1894 election saw the Liberals split between Oppositionists and Ministerialists (the majority of the latter at that election were Conservatives). Additionally, Turner's Liberals defeated McLean's Ministerial Liberals at the 1900 colonial election.

Ahead of the first 1902 state election, the new National Citizens' Reform League was formed, made up of both Liberals and Conservatives, led by Thomas Bent. The Reform League won that election, and the Liberal Oppositionists won 15 seats. Liberal Oppositionists also ran in 1904, winning 12 seats.

== Protectionist and Liberal Party (1897) ==
Protectionist and Liberal Party
- Abbreviation: PLP
- Leader: George Turner
- Founded: 1897
- Headquarters: 241 Swanston Street; Melbourne, Victoria
- Ideology: Liberalism; Protectionism
- National affiliation: Protectionist Party

The Protectionist and Liberal Party of Victoria (PLP), also known as the Protection and Liberal Party, the Liberal Protectionists or simply the Liberal Party, was a political party founded in 1897.

The party was formed ahead of the 1897 colonial election to settle disputes between several Liberal candidates standing for the same seats. At the prior election in 1894, the Protectionist Association supported Liberal candidates.

The party appeared to have links with future prime minister Alfred Deakin's Protectionist Party, which was most active in New South Wales colonial elections.

The advisory committee of the PLP met daily on Swanston Street in Melbourne.

== United Liberal Party (1907) ==
United Liberal Party
- Abbreviation: ULP
- Leader: Thomas Bent
- Founder: Thomas Bent
- Founded: 14 February 1907; 119 years ago
- Preceded by: National Citizens' Reform League
- Succeeded by: Commonwealth Liberal Party
- Ideology: Liberalism; Conservatism

The United Liberal Party (ULP), often known as the Liberal Party, was a political party formed by Thomas Bent in February 1907. The party, informally known as the 'fusees,' was formed two years before the federal 'fusion'.

The Reform League had disbanded shortly after the 1904 state election, leading to the majority of Liberals and Conservatives sitting separately before the ULP's formation.

Without Liberal Ministerialists and Liberal Oppositionists competing against each other, three-sided contests were largely eliminated, and the ULP won 49 seats at the 1907 election with more than 51% of the vote.

However, after only a single year, Liberals John Murray and Alexander Peacock successfully moved a no-confidence motion against Bent. This led to the ULP splitting and the Liberal Party forming.

Bent went to a surprise election on 29 December 1908, where the ULP suffered heavy losses.

Some newspaper reports listed the ULP as a broader 'Anti-Socialist Party,' a name also used by the Free Trade Party after 1906.

== Liberal Party (1908) ==
Liberal Party
- Abbreviation: LP
- Leader: John Murray
- Founders: John Murray; Alexander Peacock
- Founded: 1908
- Split from: United Liberal Party
- Ideology: Liberalism

The Liberal Party was formed by John Murray and Alexander Peacock after splitting from the United Liberals in 1908.

At the 1908 state election, the party outpolled the ULP with 33.94% of the statewide vote, winning 19 seats. The ULP were able to win more seats, but on 8 January 1909, Murray successfully moved a motion of no-confidence in Bent's government and succeeded him as Premier.

Like the ULP, some reports listed the Liberal Party as a broader 'Anti-Socialist Party'.

== Post-1909 ==
In 1917, the federal Liberal Party merged with the National Labor Party (who had split from the Australian Labor Party several months before) to form the Nationalist Party.

At a state level, the breaking point for the Nationalist government was Premier Alexander Peacock's decision to increase rail fares to rural areas. The party split into a pro-Peacock Ministerialists, similar to his former Liberal Party, and 'Economy Nationalists,' led by John Bowser.

At the 1917 state election, the Ministerialists won only seven seats and Bowser was elected premier.
