= James Patterson (Australian politician) =

Australian colonial politician (1833–1895)

Sir James Patterson KCMG
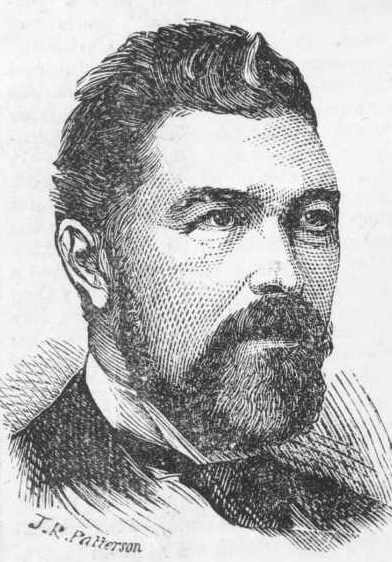

17th Premier of Victoria
- In office 23 January 1893 – 27 September 1894
- Preceded by: William Shiels
- Succeeded by: George Turner
- Constituency: Castlemaine

Minister of Railways of Victoria
- In office 14 August 1893 – 27 September 1894
- Preceded by: Duncan Gillies
- Succeeded by: Thomas Bent

Postmaster-General of Victoria
- In office 2 September 1890 – 5 November 1890
- Preceded by: Frederick Derham
- Succeeded by: John Duffy
- In office 29 July 1878 – 5 March 1880
- Preceded by: Henry Cuthbert
- Succeeded by: Henry Cuthbert

Commissioner of Trade and Customs of Victoria
- In office 16 April 1889 – 5 November 1890
- Preceded by: Henry Cuthbert
- Succeeded by: George Langridge

Personal details
- Born: 18 November 1833 Alnwick, Northumberland, England
- Died: 30 October 1895 (aged 61) Murrumbeena, Victoria, Australia
- Spouse: Anna Merrick Walton

Sir James Brown Patterson KCMG (18 November 1833 – 30 October 1895), was an Australian politician who served as premier of Victoria from 1893 to 1894.

Patterson was born in 1833 at Patterson Cottage, Alnwick, Northumberland, England to James Patterson, contractor, and Agnes, née Brown. Patterson emigrated to Victoria in 1852 to seek his fortune on the goldfields. After a few years as a digger and four as a farmer, he settled in Chewton, where he went into business as a butcher, later moving into real estate. He was Mayor of Chewton for four years before he was elected to the Victorian Legislative Assembly for Castlemaine in 1870.

A moderate conservative, Patterson served in the second third governments of the liberal leader Graham Berry, as commissioner for public works in August 1875 and as commissioner for public works and Vice-President of the Board of Land and Works in 1877–1880. From July 1878 to March 1880 he was also Postmaster-General. After 1881 he went into opposition, under the leadership of Duncan Gillies, and was commissioner for trade and customs in the Gillies government from 1889 to 1890.

With the onset of the depression which followed the end of the Land Boom in 1891, Patterson emerged as the leader of the conservative critics of the governments of James Munro and William Shiels, who tried to deal with the crash by cutting government expenditure and raising taxes. Patterson spoke for the business and middle classes who did not want increased taxation at a time of depressed trade. In January 1893 Patterson moved a successful no-confidence motion in the Shiels government and became Premier.

Patterson's government, however, had no better solutions to the depressed state of Victoria's government. A series of bank failures in April lead Patterson to declare a "bank holiday" (1 May 1893 – 5 May 1893) preventing panicked depositors from withdrawing their money. There were near-riots outside the closed banks, and confidence in the colony's finances plummeted. Later in the year Patterson became convinced that tax increases were after all inevitable, which the liberal opposition supported, but his conservative supporters revolted and he withdrew the idea, leaving himself with no policy at all.

Affairs drifted until August 1894, when Patterson in turn lost a confidence vote in the Assembly. At the resulting elections the conservatives were heavily defeated by the protectionists under George Turner. Patterson returned to the opposition benches and was created K.C.M.G. in 1894. He was still a member of Parliament when he died on 30 October 1895 from influenza in Murrumbeena, Victoria.

An 1893 portrait of Patterson by Gordon Coutts hangs in the Victorian Parliament House.

Although the surname was common in the region at the time, he is thought to be the namesake for Patterson Lakes and river, Patterson Road and locale, and the subsequently-named railway station after Bentleigh on the Frankston railway line.

Parliament of Victoria
Preceded by William Gray Baillie	Member for Castlemaine; 1870–1895	Succeeded by Sir James Whiteside McCay
Political offices
Preceded by William Shiels	Premier of Victoria; 1893–1894	Succeeded by George Turner
