= George Turner (Australian politician) =

Australian politician

The Right Honourable Sir George Turner KCMG PC
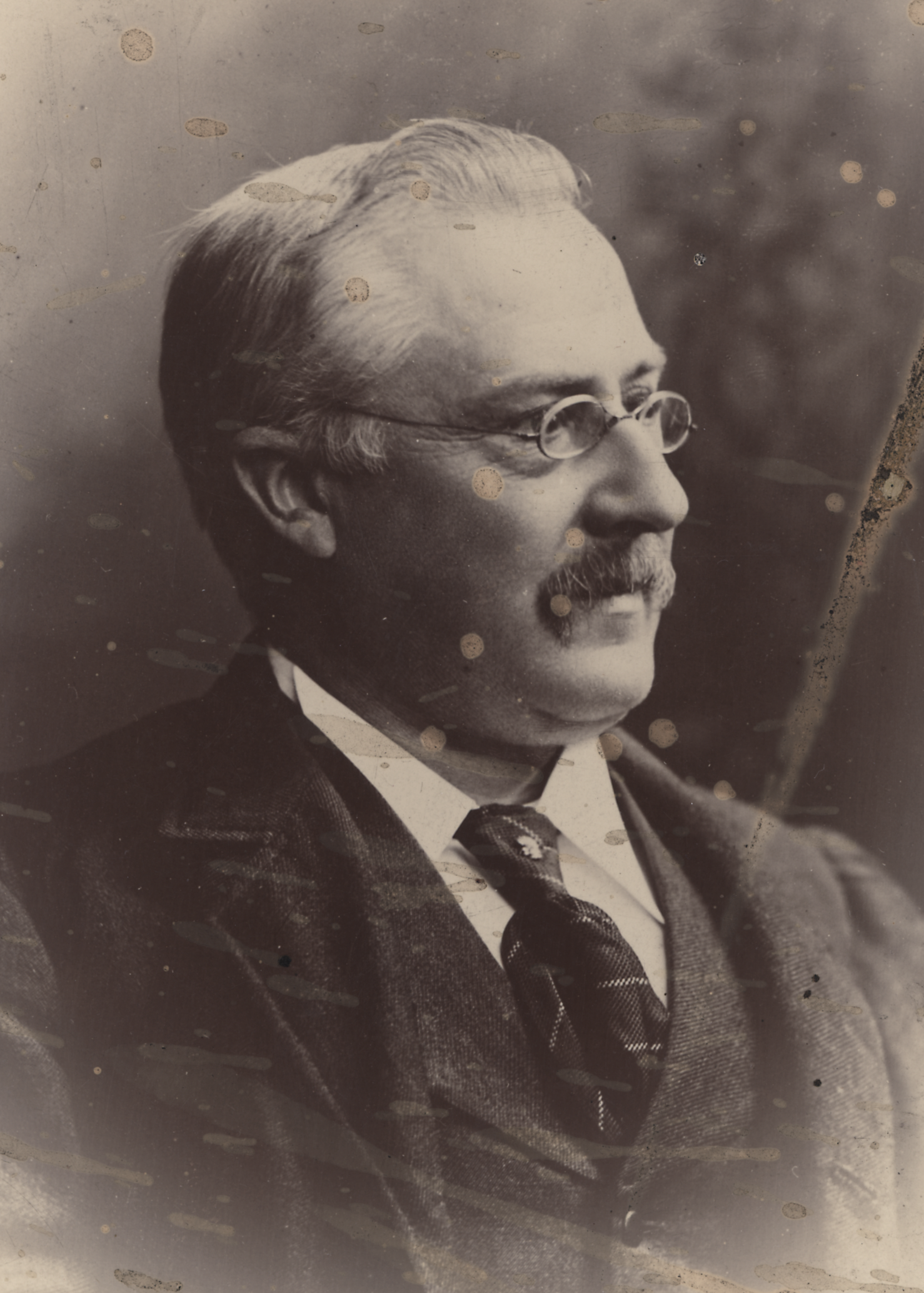
- Turner in 1901

Treasurer of Australia
- In office 17 August 1904 – 4 July 1905
- Prime Minister: George Reid
- Preceded by: Chris Watson
- Succeeded by: John Forrest
- In office 1 January 1901 – 27 April 1904
- Prime Minister: Edmund Barton; Alfred Deakin
- Preceded by: New office
- Succeeded by: Chris Watson

Premier of Victoria
- In office 19 November 1900 – 12 February 1901
- Governor: Lord Brassey
- Preceded by: Allan McLean
- Succeeded by: Alexander Peacock
- In office 27 September 1894 – 5 December 1899
- Governor: Lord Hopetoun; Lord Brassey
- Preceded by: James Patterson
- Succeeded by: Allan McLean

Member of the Australian Parliament for Balaclava
- In office 30 March 1901 – 8 November 1906
- Preceded by: New seat
- Succeeded by: Agar Wynne

Member of the Victorian Parliament for Electoral district of St Kilda
- In office 1 April 1889 – 1 February 1901
- Preceded by: Matthew Davies
- Succeeded by: William Williams

Personal details
- Born: 8 August 1851 Melbourne, Victoria, Australia
- Died: 13 August 1916 (aged 65) Hawthorn, Victoria, Australia
- Resting place: St Kilda Cemetery
- Party: Protectionist
- Spouse: Rosa Morgan (m. 1872)
- Profession: Solicitor

Sir George Turner KCMG PC (8 August 1851 – 13 August 1916) was an Australian politician. He served two terms as Premier of Victoria, holding office from 1894 to 1899 and 1900 to 1901 as a liberal. After Federation he was invited by Edmund Barton to join the inaugural federal ministry, becoming the first Treasurer of Australia. He held office until 1904 under Barton and Alfred Deakin, then a few months later resumed office under George Reid. The government fell in 1905 and Turner retired from politics at the 1906 election.

== Early life ==
Turner was born in Melbourne on 8 August 1851. He was the son of Ruth (née Dick) and Alfred Turner, who were born in England. His father worked as a cabinet-maker.

Turner was educated at the National Model School on Spring Street. He left school at the age of fourteen and began working as an office boy for John Edwards, a Melbourne solicitor and member of parliament. He joined the Australian Natives' Association (ANA) in 1872 and served as a branch treasurer. In 1875, Turner was articled to Samuel Lyons, one of the founders of the ANA. He completed the course for articled clerks at the University of Melbourne and was admitted to practise law in 1881, becoming a partner in Lyons' practice in Collins Street.

== Colonial politics ==
Turner served on the St Kilda City Council from 1885 to 1900 and was elected to a term as mayor in 1887. A liberal, he was elected to the Victorian Legislative Assembly for St Kilda in 1889. He was Minister of Health and later Solicitor-General in the liberal government of William Shiels from 1891 to 1893. When Shiels was defeated by the conservatives under James Patterson in 1893, he went into opposition, and succeeded Shiels as leader of the liberal party – mainly because Alfred Deakin, the colony's leading liberal, refused the position.

== Premier ==
At the September 1894 election the Patterson government, floundering in the face of the deep depression which followed the Crash of 1892, was heavily defeated. Turner's image as a modest, dependable suburban solicitor proved popular, and he also gained the support of the newly formed Labour Party, which won 17 seats in 1894. As well as Premier, Turner was Treasurer, Minister for Defence and Vice-President of the Board of Land and Works. The Turner Ministry of 1894 included Alexander Peacock, John Gavan Duffy and Isaac Isaacs.

Turner imposed a policy of strict economy and balanced budgets, raising taxes and cutting spending in accordance with the economic theory of the time. Although these policies did little to relieve the effects of the 1892 Depression, they did restore confidence in Victoria's public finances and the banking system. The historian Don Garden describes Turner as "frugal, prudent, unyielding and self-sacrificing," an image in tune with the deeply depressed economy. His policies of cutting government spending caused increased unemployment, but were accepted as necessary. His government was re-elected at the 1897 election.

In other areas Turner's government was more liberal. He persuaded the Legislative Council to accept the abolition of plural voting, and tried unsuccessfully to pass a bill giving votes to women (achieved in South Australia in 1892). He also introduced Victoria's first scheme of old-age pensions, together with the Victorian wages boards. This latter measure was considered to be his greatest accomplishment, which aimed to combat sweating and poverty together with reforming the hours and working conditions in shops and factories. He was made a Privy Councillor and a Knight Commander of the Order of St Michael and St George in 1897.

In December 1899 discontented radicals joined with the conservative opposition to defeat Turner's government in the Assembly, and he resigned. He was succeeded by the conservative leader Allan McLean, but Mclean was unable to consolidate his position, and at elections in November 1900 the liberals were returned and Turner again became Premier. He retained office until February 1901, when he resigned to contest the first federal elections.

== Federal politics ==
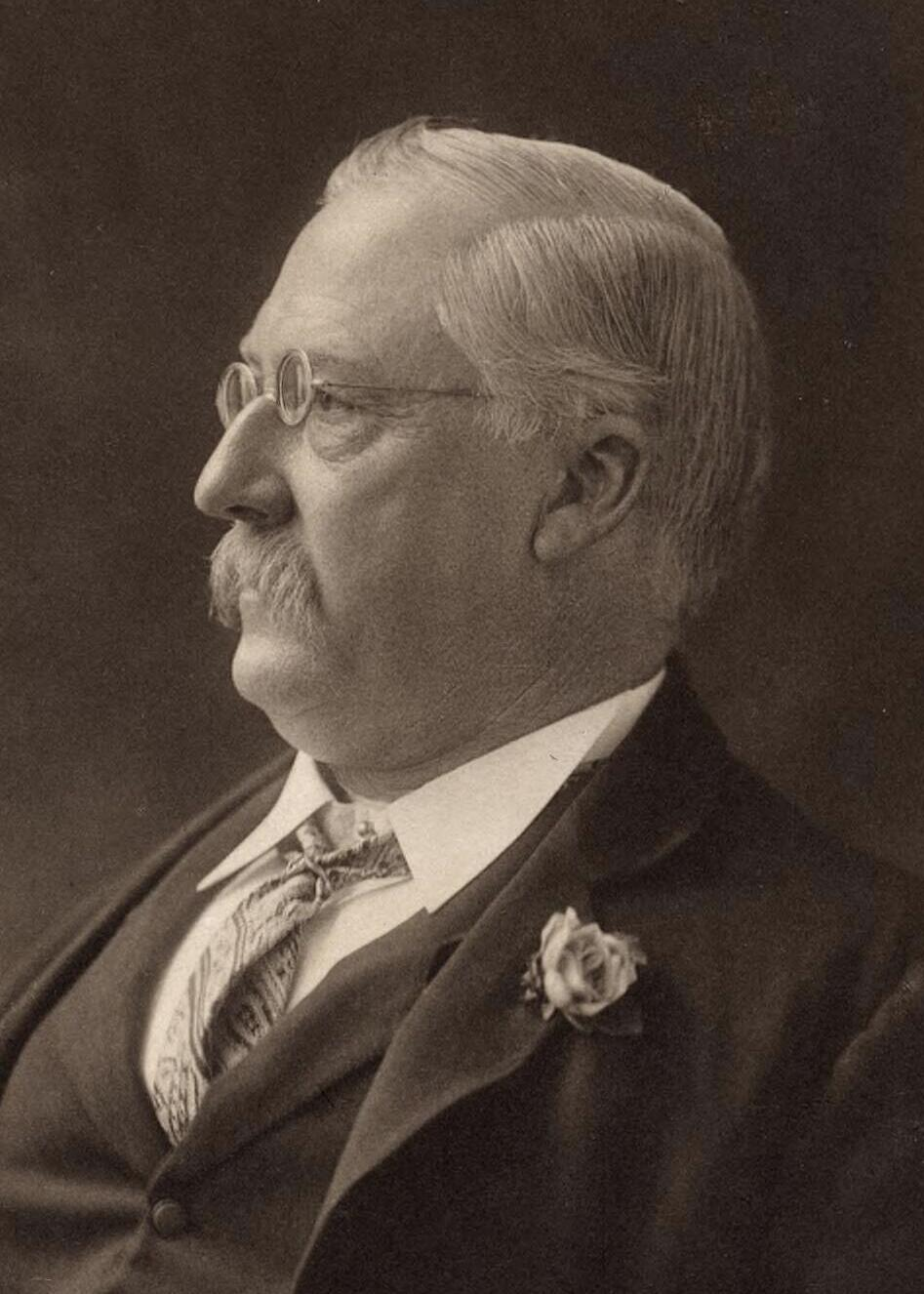
Turner around his time as federal treasurer

Turner was appointed as the inaugural federal treasurer on 1 January 1901, joining the Protectionist Party ministry assembled by Prime Minister Edmund Barton. At the subsequent 1901 federal election he was elected unopposed to the seat of Balaclava in the House of Representatives. He was again re-elected unopposed at the 1903 election.

Turner continued as treasurer under Barton's successor Alfred Deakin, serving until the Deakin government's defeat in April 1904. He was reportedly asked to continue as treasurer in Chris Watson's Australian Labor Party government, but declined for health reasons. In August 1904, with Deakin's consent, Turner was reappointed treasurer in the Free Trade Party government formed by George Reid, along with several other Protectionists. He remained treasurer in the Reid government until Deakin returned as prime minister in July 1905. He did not seek reappointment in the second Deakin ministry, both due to his health and disappointment that Deakin had not consulted him during the machinations which led to the Reid government's fall.

Turner's role as treasurer was modelled on the equivalent colonial post; Barton described it as encompassing "all matters relating to customs and finance, commonwealth loans, the taking over of state loans and cognate matters". He assisted trades and customs minister Charles Kingston in passing the first tariff legislation in 1902, which provided the government's main source of revenue. After initially relying on seconded staff from the Victorian public service, he oversaw the establishment of the Department of the Treasury, the appointment of George Allen as the first departmental secretary, and the creation of the Auditor-General's Office.

Turner delivered the first four federal budgets, although his newly established department had "more of an accounting role than an economic one". He described its work as "being chiefly ledger keeping and the inspection of accounts". The government was constrained by a reliance on tariffs for revenue and the constitution's Braddon clause, which required three-quarters of customs and excise revenue to be returned to the states. Turner was committed to balanced budgets and used conservative numbers in his budget estimates. He "soon gained a reputation for parsimony in his stewardship of the national finances" and in fact returned more money to the states than required by the constitution.

== Later life ==
Turner did not recontest his seat at the 1906 federal election. In the same year he was appointed chairman of the commissioners of the State Savings Bank of Victoria. He also resumed his legal practice in partnership with his son, which in 1907 was incorporated into the firm of Corr & Corr (later Corrs Chambers Westgarth). He also served from 24 January 1908 to 3 November 1911 as the honorary consul for Sweden in Melbourne.

== Personal life ==
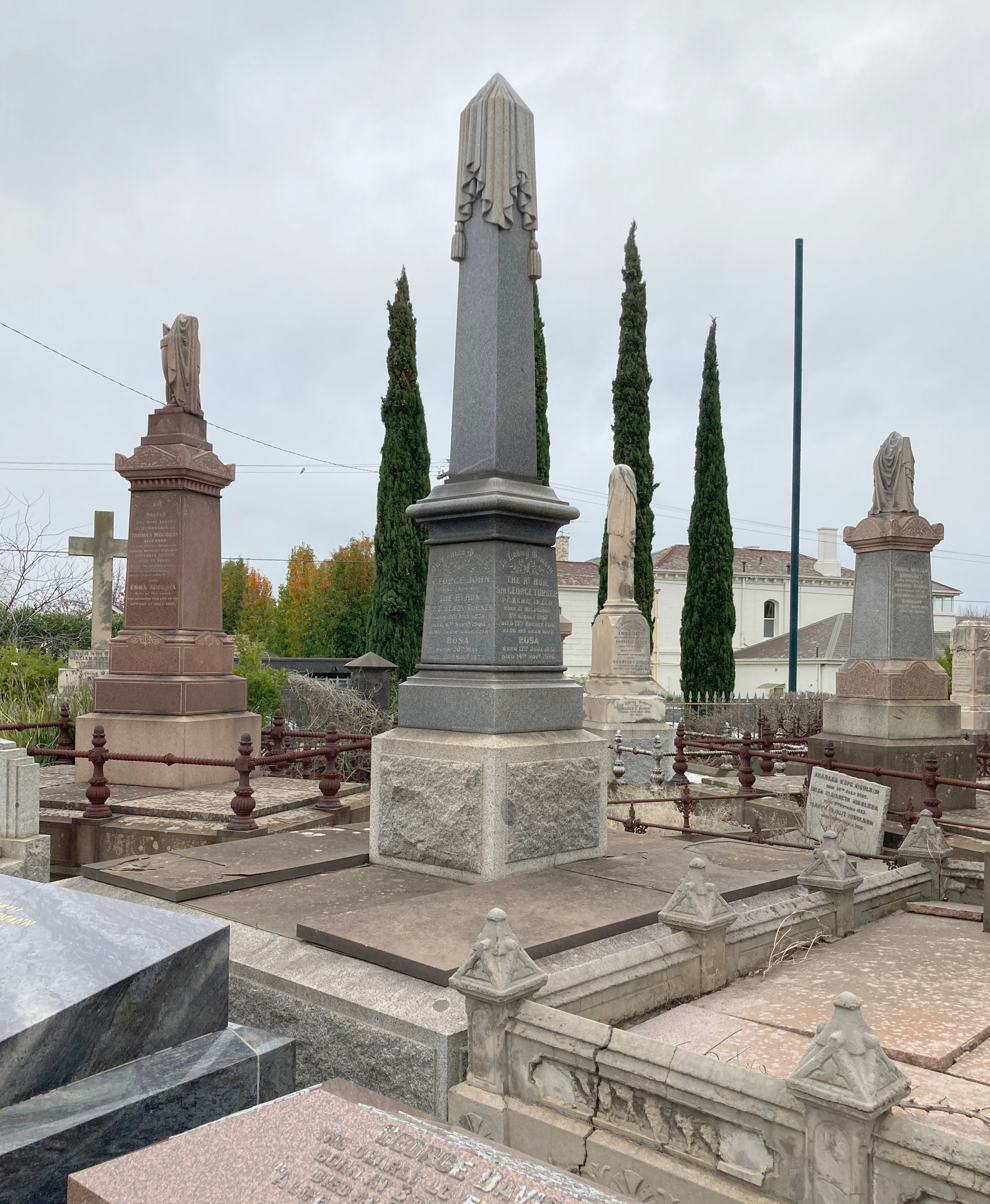
Grave of Turner and his wife at St Kilda Cemetery

In 1872, Turner married Rosa Morgan, with whom he had one son and one daughter. They lived in St Kilda until 1904, when they moved into Summerlea, a mansion in Hawthorn. His son George John Turner was killed in a railway accident in 1908 when he fell beneath the wheels of a train at Flinders Street railway station. His leg was surgically amputated but he died from his injuries two days later.

Turner suffered from extended bouts of illness in 1898 and 1901 and underwent two operations in 1904 which left him comatose for several days. He died of heart disease at his home in Hawthorn on 13 August 1916, aged 65. He was interred at St Kilda Cemetery.

== Legacy ==
Turner's biographer Geoffrey Serle concluded that he had been "grossly underestimated as a politician. He dominated his cabinet, was master of the assembly and highly respected in the House of Representatives".

=== Honours ===
- A sign on the median strip of Brighton Road (Nepean Highway), close to the western border of the Melbourne suburb of Balaclava (Coordinates: 37.870468S 144.988468E), denotes the location as the "Sir G. Turner Reserve".
- A suburb in Australia's capital city, Canberra is named after George Turner.

== Sources ==
- Hawkins, John (2007). "George Turner: Australia's first treasurer". Economic Roundup. Department of the Treasury: 59–67.
- Rickard, John (2006). "The quiet little man in a brown suit: George Turner and the politics of consensus". In Costar, Brian J; Strangio, Paul (eds.). The Victorian Premiers, 1856–2006. Federation Press. ISBN 1-86287-601-0. Archived from the original on 9 October 2023.

Victorian Legislative Assembly
Preceded by Joseph Harris	Member for St Kilda; 1889–1901	Succeeded by William Henry Williams
Political offices
Preceded by James Patterson	Premier of Victoria; 1894–1899	Succeeded by Allan McLean
Preceded by Allan McLean	Premier of Victoria; 1900–1901	Succeeded by Alexander Peacock
Australian House of Representatives
New division	Member for Balaclava; 1901–1906	Succeeded by Agar Wynne
Political offices
New office	Treasurer of Australia; 1901–1904	Succeeded by Chris Watson
Preceded by Chris Watson	Treasurer of Australia; 1904–1905	Succeeded by Sir John Forrest
