= William Shiels =

Australian politician

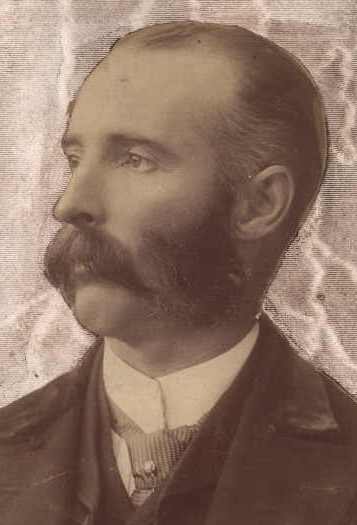

16th Premier of Victoria
- In office 16 February 1892 – 23 January 1893
- Preceded by: James Munro
- Succeeded by: James Patterson

Personal details
- Born: 3 December 1848 Maghera, County Londonderry, Ireland
- Died: 17 December 1904 (aged 56) Struan House, Naracoorte, South Australia
- Spouse: Jane

William Shiels (3 December 1848 – 17 December 1904) was an Australian colonial-era politician, serving as the 16th Premier of Victoria.

== Biography ==
Shiels was born in Maghera, County Londonderry, a town in the centre of Ulster in the north of Ireland. He was born into an Ulster-Scots Presbyterian family and arrived in Melbourne as a child in 1853. He was educated at Scotch College and the University of Melbourne, where he graduated in law and arts, gaining a master's degree in law in 1885. He was called to the Melbourne bar in 1872 and was also active in public life, being a noted campaigner for divorce law reform.

Shiels was elected to the Victorian Legislative Assembly for Normanby in 1880, as a moderate liberal, holding that seat throughout his career. He was Attorney-General and Minister for Railways in the government of James Munro from 1890 to 1892. During this time Shiels was one of the few politicians to warn against the excesses of the Land Boom which swept Victoria between 1887 and 1891. As a result, when Munro suddenly resigned in the face of imminent bankruptcy in February 1892, the liberals turned to Shiels as a "clean" new leader, and he became Premier.

The Shiels government responded to the financial disaster of the 1892 crash in the orthodox fashion of the time, cutting spending and increasing taxation to balance the budget – measures which only made the situation worse. The conservatives who had supported the coalition governments of Duncan Gillies and Munro opposed increased taxation, and during 1892 they deserted Shiels. In January 1893 the conservative leader James Patterson moved a successful no-confidence motion, and Shiels resigned.

Shiels stayed in politics and kept his reputation for integrity. He was Treasurer under Allan McLean (1899–1900) and William Irvine (1902–1903) and Minister for Railways (1903–1904). In 1904, however, his health broke down and he retired to rural South Australia shortly before his death, aged only 56. Shiels is buried at Struan House which is located on the Riddoch HWY 10 km out of Naracoorte in South Australia's South East.

Parliament of Victoria
Preceded by William Tytherleigh	Member for Normanby; 1880–1904	Succeeded by Electorate abolished

Preceded by James Munro	Premier of Victoria; 1892–1893	Succeeded by James Patterson
