= James Service =

Australian politician (1823–1899)

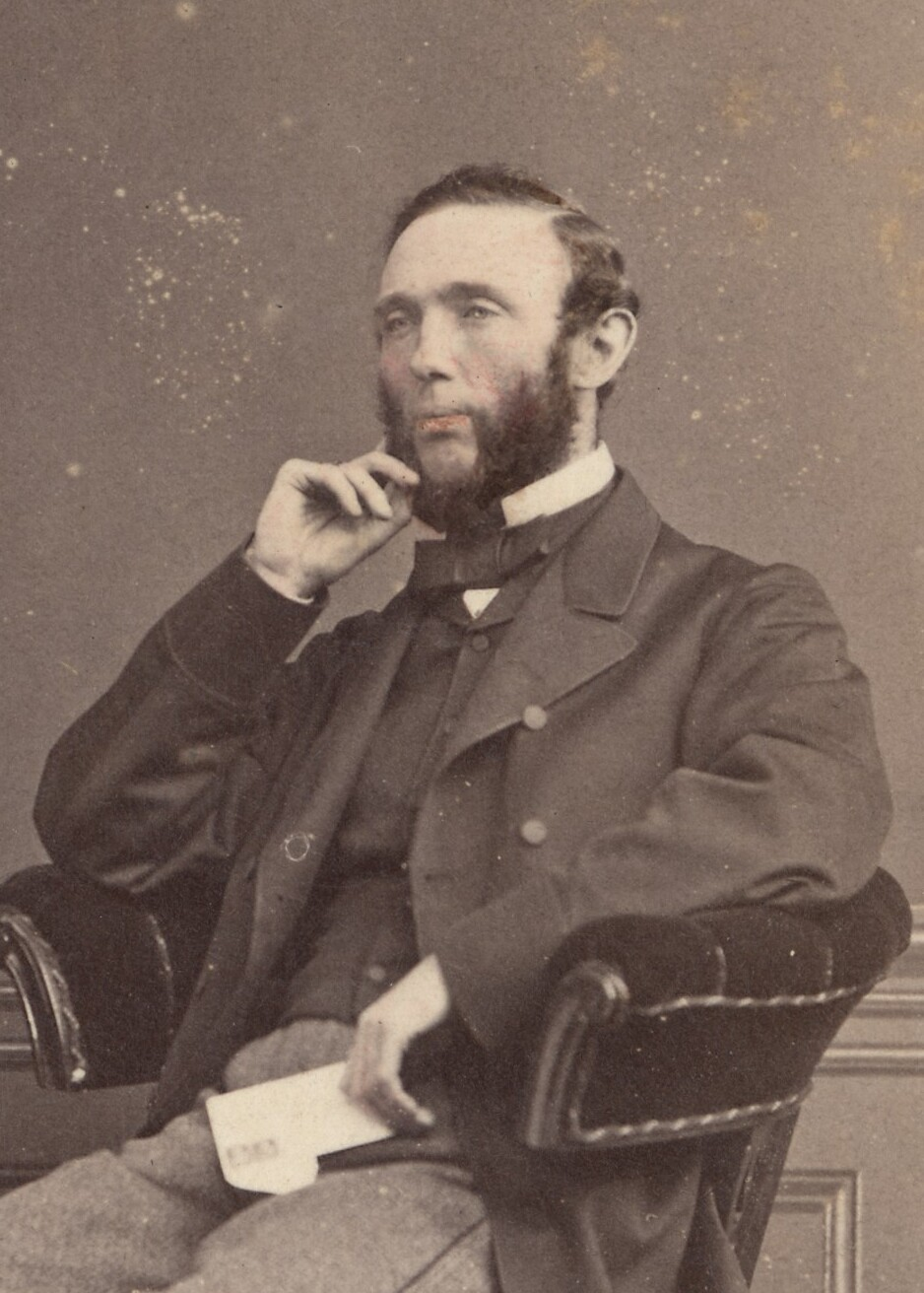

12th Premier of Victoria
- In office 5 March 1880 – 3 August 1880
- Preceded by: Graham Berry
- Succeeded by: Graham Berry
- In office 8 March 1883 – 18 February 1886
- Preceded by: Bryan O'Loghlen
- Succeeded by: Duncan Gillies

Personal details
- Born: 27 November 1823 Kilwinning, Ayrshire, Scotland
- Died: 12 April 1899 (aged 75) Melbourne, Victoria, Australia

James Service (27 November 1823 – 12 April 1899), an Australian colonial politician, was the 12th premier of Victoria, Australia.

== Biography ==
Service was born in Kilwinning, Ayrshire, Scotland, the son of Robert Service. As a young man James worked in a Glasgow tea importing business, Thomas Corbett and Company. He was a founding member of the Emerald Hill municipal council (now South Melbourne) in 1855, and of the Commercial Bank of Australia in 1866, going on to become a prominent banker and representative of Melbourne business interests.

Service was elected to the Victorian Legislative Assembly for Melbourne in a by-election in March 1857, retaining this seat until August 1859. He then represented Ripon and Hampden from October 1859 to around August 1862, Maldon from May 1874 to March 1881 and Castlemaine from June 1883 to February 1886. He was a moderate liberal in the context of Victorian politics, but as a free trader he increasingly sided with the conservatives, since all the more radical liberals were protectionists. He was President of the Board of Land and Works in the Nicholson government from 1859 to 1860 and Treasurer in the Kerferd government from 1874 to 1875. His attempt to cut tariffs in his 1875 budget led to the fall of Kerferd's government.

When Graham Berry's radical ministry fell in March 1880, Service formed a minority government. In May Service admitted that he could not go on and asked the Governor, Lord Normanby, for a dissolution, which was granted. But the elections did not improve Service's position and in August he resigned, allowing Berry to return to power.

In March 1883 the liberals under Berry's successor, Sir Bryan O'Loghlen were defeated at elections, and Service formed a new and much stronger government, taking the Treasury as well as the Premiership. When Service agreed not to attempt to reduce tariffs, Berry joined him as a minister: such was the fluidity of party politics at this time. The young Alfred Deakin held office for the first time in this government. The Service government lasted three years and passed some important legislation, including a Public Service Act which removed political patronage from the public service, a new Factories Act and a new Lands Act.

By the time of the 1886 election Service was in declining health and decided to retire from active politics and return to England for a while. In 1888 he was elected to the Victorian Legislative Council for Melbourne Province, and served there until April 1899.

Preceded by Graham Berry	Premier of Victoria; 1880	Succeeded by Graham Berry
Preceded by Bryan O'Loghlen	Premier of Victoria; 1883-1886	Succeeded by Duncan Gillies
