= Graham Berry =

Australian politician (1822–1904)

Sir Graham Berry KCMG
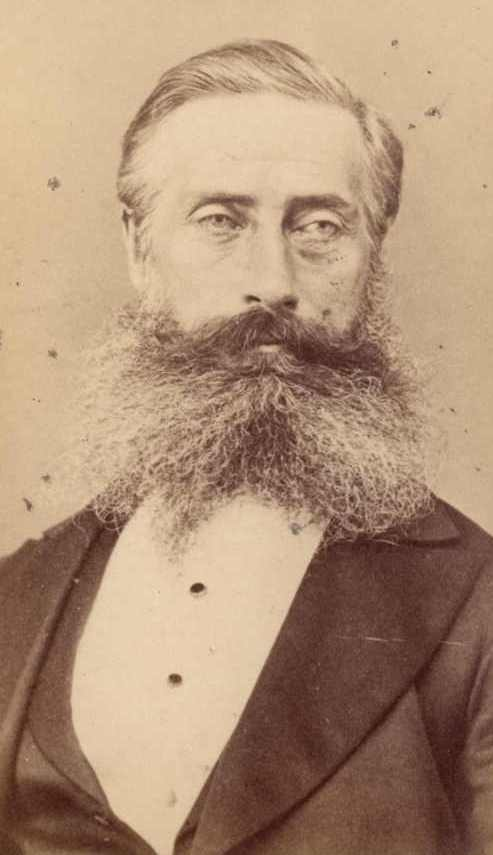

11th Premier of Victoria
- In office 7 August 1875 – 20 October 1875
- Constituency: Geelong West (1869–77)
- Preceded by: George Kerferd
- Succeeded by: James McCulloch
- In office 21 May 1877 – 5 March 1880
- Preceded by: James McCulloch
- Succeeded by: James Service
- Constituency: Geelong (1877–86)
- In office 3 August 1880 – 9 July 1881
- Preceded by: James Service
- Succeeded by: Bryan O'Loghlen
- Constituency: Geelong

7th Speaker of the Victorian Legislative Assembly
- In office 4 October 1894 – September 1897
- Preceded by: Thomas Bent
- Succeeded by: Francis Mason

Personal details
- Born: 28 August 1822 London, England
- Died: 25 January 1904 (aged 81) Victoria, Australia
- Spouse(s): Harriet Ann Bencowe and Rebecca Evans

Sir Graham Berry (28 August 1822 – 25 January 1904) was an Australian colonial politician and the 11th Premier of Victoria. He was one of the most radical and colourful figures in the politics of colonial Victoria, and made the most determined efforts to break the power of the Victorian Legislative Council, the stronghold of the landowning class.

== Early years ==
Berry was born in Twickenham, near London, where his father, Benjamin Berry, was a licensed victualler. He had a primary education until 11 years old, then became an apprentice draper. In 1848 he married Harriet Ann Blencowe, with whom he had eleven children.

== Migration ==
In 1852 he migrated to Victoria, and went into business as a grocer in Prahran, then as a general storekeeper in South Yarra. His business skills and Victoria's booming economy soon made him a wealthy man. After his first wife's death he married Rebekah Evans in 1871; the couple had seven children of their own. At his death, Berry was survived by eight of the children from his first marriage and all seven of the children from his second marriage.

In Victoria, Berry, by voracious reading, acquired the education he had missed in England, and taught himself economics, literature and philosophy. But all his life he retained a broad London accent, which many Victorian conservatives found offensive or amusing. In Parliament he once asked the Speaker: "What is now before the 'Ouse?" To which the Leader of the Opposition interjected: "An H!" He developed a powerful rhetorical style modelled on that of his hero Gladstone, equally effective in the rough-house of the colonial Parliament or on the hustings. The conservative newspaper The Argus conceded: "His oratory might not be polished: it certainly was not—but it was passionate, and it told." Noted for his humour, Berry was nevertheless a tough and determined politician.

== Political career ==
Berry was elected to the Legislative Assembly for East Melbourne at a by-election in 1861, as what The Argus called "an extreme liberal." At the general election later in the same year he switched to Collingwood, then famously the most radical electorate in the colony. He was re-elected in 1864, but his criticism of James McCulloch's government during the tariff crisis of 1865 led to his defeat in that year's snap election.

In 1866 Berry moved to Geelong, where he started a newspaper, the Geelong Register, as a rival to the established Geelong Advertiser. Using the paper as a platform, he was elected for Geelong West in February 1869. In 1877 he switched to Geelong, which he represented until February 1886. He was briefly Treasurer in John MacPherson's government in 1870. When Charles Gavan Duffy formed a strong liberal government in June 1871, Berry again became Treasurer. He was a convinced protectionist, and steered a bill for increased tariffs through the Parliament.

=== Premier ===
After the conservative interlude of the Francis and Kerferd governments, Berry assumed leadership of the liberals and became Premier and Treasurer in August 1875. But the liberal majority in the Assembly was unreliable, and in October the government's budget was defeated and Berry resigned. He asked the Governor, Sir George Bowen, for a dissolution, but was refused. He then campaigned across the colony in opposition to the third McCulloch government. At the May 1877 election, with the powerful backing of the Melbourne Age under David Syme, he won a huge liberal majority in the Assembly and returned to office at the head of a radical ministry.

Berry's election manifesto proposed a punitive land tax designed to break up the squatter class's great pastoral properties – about 800 men at this time owned most of Victoria's grazing lands. He also advocated a high tariff to benefit local manufacturing, which threatened to harm the importing and banking interests. He promised that if the council, which was elected on a limited property-based franchise, blocked his program, it would be "dealt with according to its deserts." He described the council as "a chamber which robs the people of the gold in the soil and the land God gave them." Given that there was no mechanism in the Victorian Constitution to override the council, this was taken by conservatives to be a threat of revolutionary violence.

Berry was a devoted constitutional liberal and had no plans for illegal measures. But the councillors were sufficiently alarmed to pass a modified version of Berry's land tax bill, despite the urgings of the ultra-conservative former Premier Sir Charles Sladen to reject it outright. Berry, emboldened, next introduced a bill for the payment of members of the Assembly, which the trade unions were demanding so that working class candidates could be elected. Berry "tacked" the bill to the Appropriation Bill so that council could not reject it without paralysing the colony's finances. The council resented this blackmail and at Sladen's urging declined to pass the bill, laying it aside.

With the two houses deadlocked, Berry embarked on a public campaign of "coercion" against the council. "We coerce madmen", he said, "We put them into lunatic asylums, and never was anything more the act of madmen than the rejection of the Appropriation Bill." To bring matters to a head, on 8 January 1878 ("Black Wednesday") Berry's government began to dismiss public servants, starting with police and judges, arguing that without an Appropriation Bill they could not be paid. Berry next brought in a bill to strip the council of its powers, which the council of course rejected.

For the next two years Berry clung to office while the colony was gripped with class conflict, including huge torchlit processions through Melbourne sponsored by The Age (pro-Berry) and The Argus (anti-Berry) – although, remarkably, there was almost no violence. Almost no legislation was passed and the administration ground to a halt as funds ran out. Berry's next tactic was to pass a bill through the assembly stating that finance bills did not need to be passed by the council, but would become law when passed by the assembly. Bowen thought this bill unconstitutional, but signed it on Berry's advice. When the Colonial Office learned of this, Bowen was recalled and the bill disallowed.

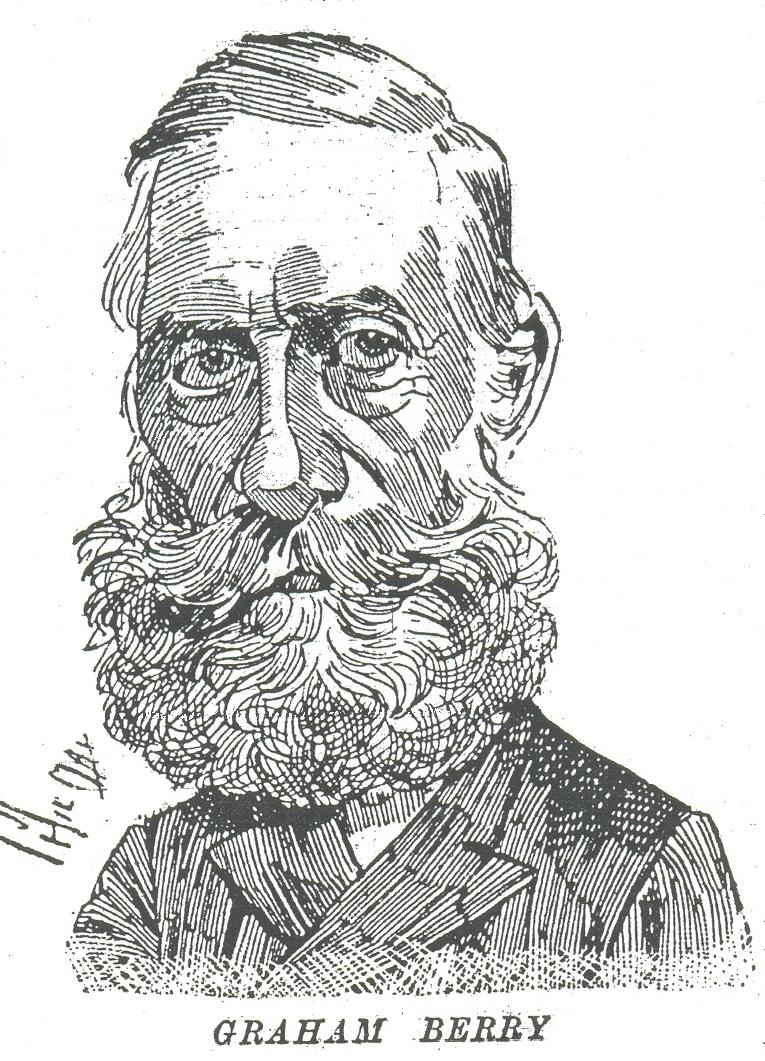
An obituary illustration of Sir Graham Berry, 1904

Finally a compromise was reached, the payment of members bill was passed, and the sacked public servants were reinstated. Berry then introduced another bill to reduce the powers of the council. When this was rejected, he decided to appeal directly to London. In 1879 Berry and another leading liberal, Charles Pearson, travelled to London to try to persuade the British Government to amend the Victorian Constitution in such a way as to reduce the power of the council. Unfortunately for them, the Conservatives under Benjamin Disraeli were in power, and the Colonial Secretary, Sir Michael Hicks-Beach, refused to agree to Berry's requests.

Returning to Melbourne empty-handed, Berry was welcomed by huge crowds, but the popularity of his government was declining and his majority in the assembly was crumbling under the strain of the crisis. He tried to pass another bill to amend the constitution, but in December 1879 it failed by one vote to gain the necessary two-thirds in the assembly. Berry then resigned, and at the subsequent election he was very narrowly defeated. The conservatives under James Service formed a weak government, which resigned in June 1880, leading to another election, which the liberals won, though not as convincingly as they had done in 1877.

Berry returned as premier, and formed a much more moderate ministry than the one which had fallen in 1879. Both sides were exhausted by the struggle, and in July 1881 a modest reform bill was passed as the Legislative Council Act 1881 (45 Vict. No. 702), including some reforms of council elections, but no concessions on the essential powers of the council. Berry, feeling he could do no more, resigned, and Bryan O'Loghlen formed another weak conservative government. Later Berry accepted office as Chief Secretary and Postmaster-General in a coalition government led by Service, from 1883 to 1886.

== Later years ==
In 1886 Berry resigned from Parliament and was appointed Victorian Agent-General in London, then an important and prestigious post. He was also appointed Executive Commissioner to the Colonial and Indian Exhibition, for his services in connection with which he was created K.C.M.G., becoming Sir Graham Berry. He was lionised as a liberal hero in London. Berry was one of the representatives of Victoria at the Colonial Conference held in London in 1887, and took a prominent part in its proceedings. For his services in connection with the Paris Exhibition of 1889 he was appointed a Commander of the Legion of Honour by the French Government. Berry was also awarded the Order of the Crown of Italy.

Although he was now 70, he was not yet done with politics. Returning to Melbourne in 1892, just as the great post-gold rush economic boom was collapsing and the colony entering a severe depression, he was elected for East Bourke Boroughs at the May 1892 elections. He was Treasurer in William Shiels's Liberal government.

While he had been in London, Berry had been a London director of Mercantile Bank of Australia, a land boom era banking venture associated with Matthew Henry Davies. Following his return from London, Berry remained a director of that bank, and continued to be one after he became Treasurer. Mercantile Bank was exposed in the weekly magazine, Table Talk, as having carried out some highly questionable transactions in the lead up to its collapse. In February 1892, a month before the bank suspended payments, Berry had said, "A good institution has been established, and it is for shareholders to act like men and not run away like children". A fellow director stated that, "The rumours about the bank that have been circulated are entirely unfounded". Later, evidence showed that some directors had seen an internal document showing losses, up to that time, of £830,000, and that the bank had borrowed £100,000 from another bank, and, it was alleged, used that money to pay an 8% dividend, shortly before closing down. A promissory note for £20,000, from the Premier, James Munro, had been discounted by the bank, just before the bank had closed its doors, and Munro had moved to London as Agent-General. Table Talk advocated that the directors should be prosecuted.

As was allowed by the laws of the time, Berry became one of the liquidators of the Mercantile Bank. Table Talk called for his resignation as Treasurer, stating in September 1892, "it would doubtless become Sir Graham Berry to resign not later than when the adjourned meeting takes place in October. Noblesse oblige. A Treasurer acting as liquidator to a fraudulently managed bank, of which he was at one time an ornamental (not a working) director is not a spectacle calculated to inspire the British investor with confidence in the Government of the colony." Berry resigned as Treasurer, in January 1893.

In September 1893, Matthew Davies and some others associated with the Mercantile Bank, but not Berry, were finally committed for trial for having "with intent to defraud, unlawfully published a statement and account called 'Directors' report and balance-sheet on 1st February, 1892,' well knowing it to be false". In March 1894, after Justice Hood's summing up—it very much favoured the defence—the defendants were found not guilty, in a Supreme Court jury trial.

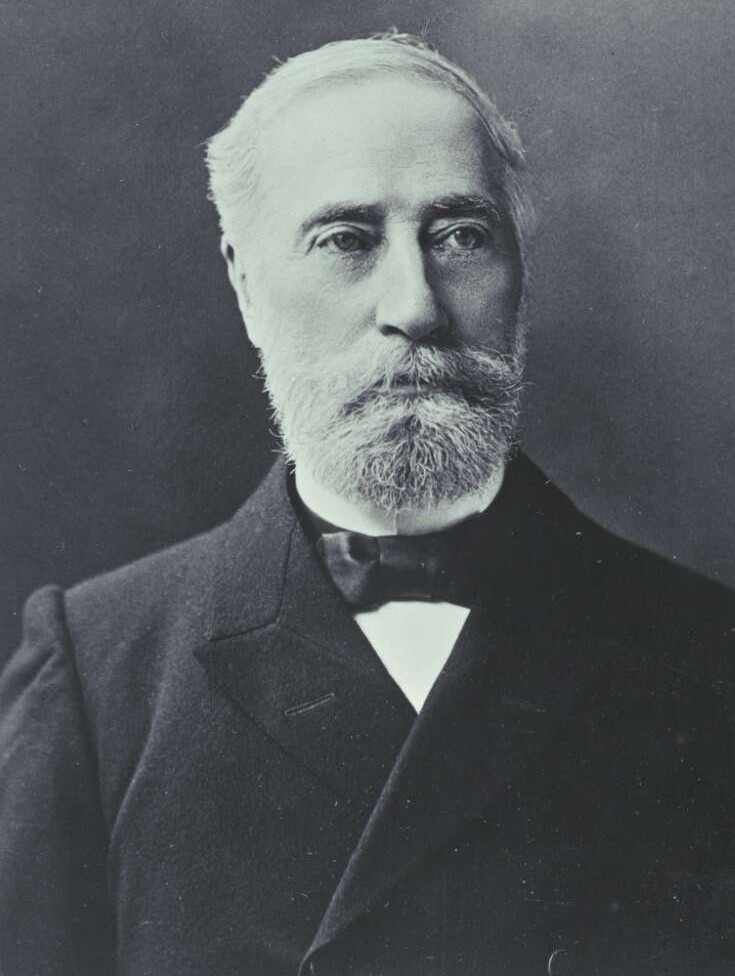
Berry at the 1898 Australasian Federal Convention.

The days of reforming liberalism in Victoria were over for the time being. In October 1894, Berry was elected Speaker, a post he held until September 1897, when he finally retired.

Berry was granted a pension by Parliament in the Berry Annuity Act 1897 (61 Vict. No. 1535), and devoted the remainder of his life to supporting the cause of Australian Federation. In 1897 he was elected a Victorian delegate to the Constitutional Convention which drafted the Australian Constitution, mainly because of the support of The Age. He was out of sympathy with the tendency of the opinion at the convention, and more often than not voted on the losing side of divisions, the only delegate with that distinction. At 75, he was too frail to contribute much except his prestige as one of the country's radical heroes. He retired to the seaside with his enormous family, and died at St Kilda in 1904. He was given a state funeral and eulogised by Prime Minister Alfred Deakin.

The Age editorialised on Berry's death: "Sir Graham Berry had ten years of such storms as might well have daunted one less resolute. But he lived to see the triumph of almost all the great reforms he had fought for." This was not strictly true, since the conservative domination of the Legislative Council lasted unbroken for nearly a century after his death, but Berry certainly deserved to be remembered as the most determined radical politician in 19th century Victoria.

== Portrayals on screen ==
Berry appears as a minor character in the 2003 film Ned Kelly, played by Australian actor Charles Tingwell.

Political offices
Preceded by George Kerferd	Premier of Victoria; 1875	Succeeded by James McCulloch
Preceded by James McCulloch	Premier of Victoria; 1877–1880	Succeeded by James Service
Preceded by James Service	Premier of Victoria; 1880–1881	Succeeded by Bryan O'Loghlen
