= Conservatism in Australia =

Conservatism in Australia refers to the political philosophy of conservatism as it has developed in Australia. Politics in Australia has, since at least the 1910s, been most predominantly a contest between the Australian labour movement (primarily the Australian Labor Party) and the combined forces of the Classical Liberal, Conservative, and anti-labour movement groups (primarily the Liberal-National Coalition). The conservative groups have at times identified themselves as "free trade", "nationalist", "anti-communist", "liberal", and "right of centre", among other labels; until the 1990s, the label "conservative" had rarely been used in Australia, and when used it tended to be used by pro-Labour forces as a term of disparagement against their opponents. Electorally, conservatism tends to be the most popular political brand in Australian history.

== Terminology ==
In the early 20th century, "Conservatism" was used as a disparaging epithet by detractors of right wing politics and politicians within Australia, often by supporters and members of left leaning movements and parties such as the Australian Labor Party and later the Australian Greens. People on the right often called themselves "liberals". That only changed in the late 20th century; John Hirst says that as a significant political movement, conservatism is "a very recent arrival in Australia". John Howard, who became prime minister in 1996, was the first holder of the office to describe himself as a conservative."

In the 21st century the term covers similar political issues as found in other Western democracies. In the early 20th century the liberals had connections with reform movements. However, as Howard has argued, the Liberal Party became the trustee of both the classical liberal and conservative traditions. That is, it combines liberal (market-based, pro-business, anti-union) economic policies with conservative social policies.

Although used much less than the term conservative, former Prime Minister Scott Morrison (Liberal) described himself as a traditionalist upon his ascent to party leader and appointment as Prime Minister (2018–2022). Similarly, former Liberal MP for Moreton (1955–1983) and Minister for Defence (1975–1982) and the Navy (1969–1971), James Killen, was considered to be a Tory, or a "Tory Liberal", especially in his younger years.

== History ==
Unlike the various forms of conservatism across the world, especially in the United Kingdom and the United States, Australian conservatism has a short history.

In the late 19th century, the Free Trade Party and the Protectionist Party were the two major parties in Australia. The Free Trade Party was generally more conservative while the Protectionist Party was generally more liberal, though both parties contained liberal and conservative factions. When the Australian labour movement emerged, both parties began attempting to form a united alliance against it. George Reid, the leader of the Free Trade Party between 1901 and 1905, and Prime Minister of Australia from 1904 to 1905, imagined an Australian political spectrum that ran from socialist to anti-socialist, and attempted to reframe the party system this way. This was welcomed by politicians who were influenced by the Westminster tradition and who regarded a two-party system as the norm. In 1909, the two parties merged to form the Commonwealth Liberal Party to more effectively oppose the new Labor Party.

In 1920, the Country Party (now known as the National Party) was formed as an agrarian conservative party representing the interests of farmers. After the 1922 federal election, which produced a hung parliament, the Country Party and the Nationalist Party (the successor to the Commonwealth Liberal Party) formed a conservative coalition. The Nationalist Party later became the United Australia Party in 1931. After the United Australia Party collapsed in 1945, conservative forces within Australia were in disarray and were seen as irrelevant. This is when the Liberal Party emerged, establishing itself as a big tent party of the right, taking influence from classical conservative thinker Edmund Burke.

== Political parties ==
Mainstream political conservatism is primarily represented by the Liberal Party of Australia, and its coalition partner, the National Party, which historically was the party of the conservative small farmers and espoused agrarianism. The Liberal Party was formed in 1944 as a successor of the United Australia Party, which had been formed in 1931 as a successor of the Nationalist Party and ideologically similar parties that preceded it. The Liberal Party's ideology has been described as conservative, liberal-conservative, conservative-liberal, and classical liberal. The Liberal Party tends to promote economic liberalism (which in the Australian usage refers to free markets and small government).

Moser and Catley state, "In America, 'liberal' means left-of-center, and it is a pejorative term when used by conservatives in adversarial political debate. In Australia, of course, the conservatives are in the Liberal Party." Jupp points out that, "[the] decline in English influences on Australian reformism and radicalism, and appropriation of the symbols of Empire by conservatives continued under the Liberal Party leadership of Sir Robert Menzies, which lasted until 1966." Beecher comments that, "across the economic and cultural landscape, Howard proved that the centre of politics in Australia is inherently conservative."

There are also other minor parties which may be perceived to be conservative in orientation on account of some of their policies - and even some are regarded as right wing or extreme right, such as the Democratic Labor Party, One Nation Party, Liberal Democratic Party, Family First Party, Australian Christians, Shooters, Fishers and Farmers Party, and Katter's Australian Party, although some would not champion the classical liberal approach to economics adopted by the Liberal Party. In the 45th Australian Senate, the Liberal Democratic Party's David Leyonhjelm, independent Cory Bernardi, independent Fraser Anning and the United Australia Party's Brian Burston formally formed a "conservative bloc".

Since the 2010s, an increasing number of prominent conservative members of the Liberal/National coalition have left the party, such as in 2017 with Senator Cory Bernardi and in 2022 with MP George Christensen.

== Think tanks and other entities ==
According to political historian and journalist Paul Kelly, in Australia there are some differences in the political landscape in which conservatism exists, compared to what is found in other countries, especially in economics. Australia undertook in the mid-1980s significant economic reforms – faith in markets, deregulation, a reduced role for government, low protection and the creation of a new cooperative enterprise culture – under the centre-left Australian Labor Party and especially under social liberal Paul Keating."

Some think tanks in Australia have a conservative focus. The Centre for Independent Studies, for example, focuses on classical liberal issues such as free markets and limited government, while the Institute of Public Affairs advocates free market economic policies such as privatisation and deregulation of state-owned enterprises, trade liberalisation and deregulated workplaces, climate change scepticism, the abolition of the minimum wage, and the repeal of parts of the Racial Discrimination Act 1975. The H. R. Nicholls Society focuses on industrial relations, and advocates full workplace deregulation, contains some Liberal MPs as members and is seen to be of the New Right. The Menzies Research Centre is an associated entity of the Liberal Party. The Samuel Griffith Society is a legal think tank that advocates constitutional conservatism, federalism and black letter law jurisprudence, and has reportedly been influential in recent Coalition appointments to administrative tribunals and the Judiciary.

Apart from political parties, conservative grass-roots movements have also arisen in Australia in recent years. Q Society of Australia is a far-right anti-Muslim association that works closely with the Australian Liberty Alliance. Some of these may have connections to existing political leaders, such as Senator Cory Bernardi's Conservative Leadership Foundation (which is dedicated to fostering community based conservative leadership) or explicitly reject party politics in favour of cultural restoration, such as the Sydney Traditionalist Forum and Edmund Burke's Club (which are described as "an association of 'old school' conservative, traditionalist and paleoconservative individuals").

Advance is a conservative political lobbying group launched in 2018.

Church and State (CAS) is a conservative Christian "political education ministry" founded by David Pellowe (Note: Candidate for Family First Party in the 2015 Queensland state election and 2016 Australian federal election.) in 2018. At their 2023 conference, presenters included Mark Latham, George Christensen, John Anderson, Craig Kelly, Malcolm Roberts, and Joel Jammal, founder and national director of Turning Point Australia.

== Media ==
Two national newspapers in Australia, The Australian and The Australian Financial Review, take a conservative stance. Since the 1970s, the Financial Review has advocated economic liberalism in Australia, driving a consistent editorial line favouring small government, deregulation, privatisation, lower taxes and trade liberalisation.

Major conservative regional newspapers include The Daily Telegraph, The West Australian, The Mercury, The Canberra Times, The Advertiser and The Courier-Mail.

The primary conservative magazines in Australia are News Weekly, Quadrant and The Spectator Australia.

On television, a conservative outlook is represented by Sky News Australia. and ADH TV.

Newspapers and other publications owned by News Corp strongly favour the right wing of Australian politics. The publications owned by News Corp include The Australian, The Daily Telegraph, The Mercury, The Advertiser and The Courier-Mail. Sky News is also owned by News Corp.

== Ideology ==
Conservatives in Australia oppose social liberal policies such as legalising recreational cannabis and led opposition to the Indigenous Voice to Parliament.

=== Monarchism ===
Mainstream Australian conservatives typically support Australia remaining a constitutional monarchy.

Whether Australia should remain a monarchy or become a republic was a contentious issue in the 1990s. In 1998 when debate peaked, John Howard took the monarchist position favoured by most conservatives. Howard argued that the monarchy had provided a long period of stability and while he said there was no question that Australia was a fully independent nation, he believed that the "separation of the ceremonial and executive functions of government" and the presence of a neutral "defender of constitutional integrity" was an advantage in government and that no republican model would be as effective in providing such an outcome as the Australian constitutional monarchy. Despite opinion polls initially suggesting Australians favoured a republic, the 1999 republic referendum rejected the model proposed by the 1998 convention involving appointment of the head of state by Parliament. Conservatives generally support keeping the current flag (with its British insignia) and are proud of the nation's British heritage.

== Aboriginal members of conservative parties ==
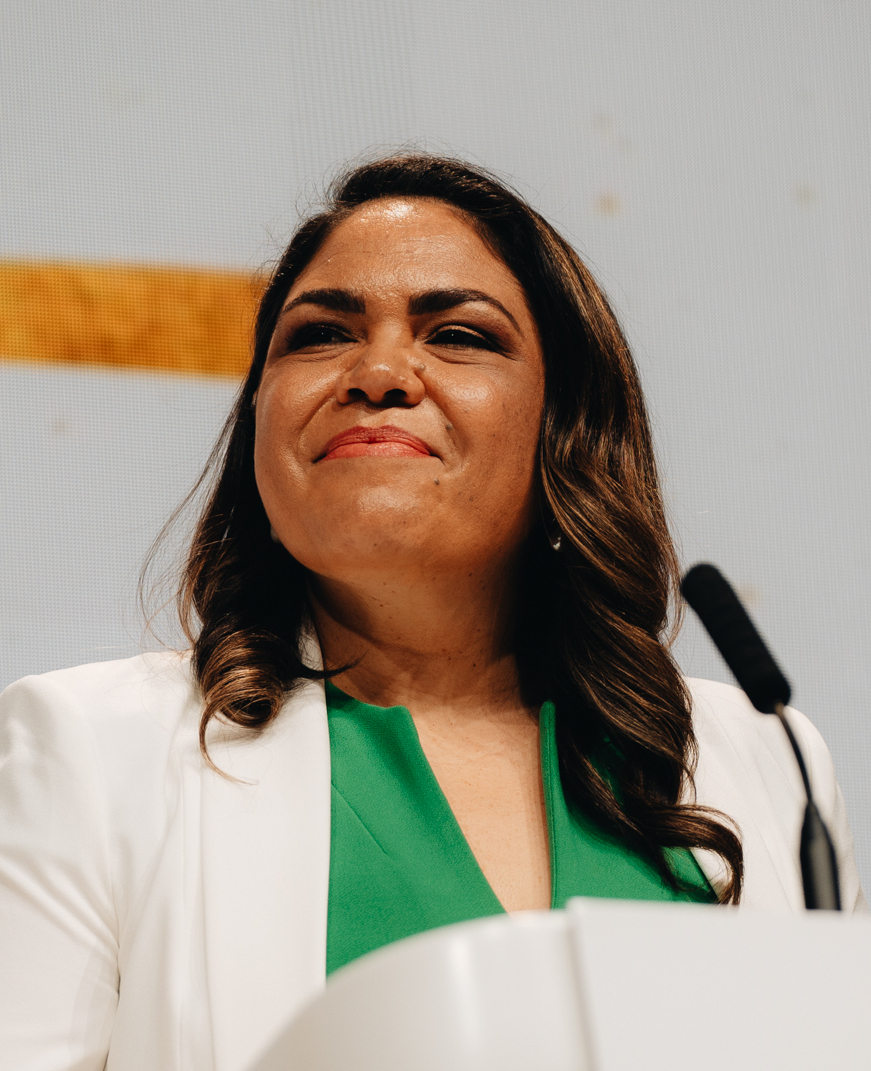
Jacinta Nampijinpa Price

Traditionally, Aboriginal Australians in cities have been known to predominantly vote for parties of the political left, such as the Australian Labor Party or the Australian Greens. Despite this, there are numerous Aboriginal activists, politicians and individuals affiliated with the political right. The most prominent Aboriginal Conservative was Neville Bonner who was the first Aboriginal Australian elected to federal Parliament. In the Northern Territory, the Country Liberal Party has had a fluctuating relationship with the state's Indigenous communities (even providing Australia's first Indigenous head of government, Adam Giles) and holds several of the territory's electorates with large Aboriginal populations.

Jacinta Price is a well-known conservative activist of Warlpiri descent who was elected to the Senate for the Country Liberal Party representing Northern Territory in 2022. Price has argued against claims of systemic racism against Aboriginals in the criminal justice system, instead arguing that "black-on-black violence" is most pressing in Aboriginal communities. Unlike many Aboriginal activists, Price opposes changing the date of Australia Day, describing the proposal as "virtue-signaling".

Kerrynne Liddle is a former journalist and Arrernte woman originally from Alice Springs. At the 2022 she was elected as a Liberal senator for South Australia.

Originally a member of Labor, former Indigenous Advisory Council (IAC) member Warren Mundine has since shifted toward the political right. Mundine has criticised what he describes as efforts to introduce "critical race theory" in Australian schools, arguing it promotes a victim mentality among Aboriginals.

Former Aboriginal conservative politicians include:

- Adam Giles – Served as the Chief Minister of the Northern Territory (2013–2016).
- Joanna Lindgren – A former Liberal National Senator for Queensland (2015–2016).
- Hyacinth Tungutalum – The first Aboriginal Australian elected to a State or Territorial parliament; member of the Country Liberal Party (1974–1977).
- Bess Price – A former Northern Territory Minister for Community Services; member of the Country Liberal Party (2012–2016)
- Eric Deeral – Queensland MP representing the Country Party (1974–1977)

== See also ==
- Christian politics in Australia
- History wars
- Liberalism in Australia
- Socialism in Australia
- Far-right politics in Australia

== Bibliography ==
- Brett, Judith (2003). Australian Liberals and the Moral Middle Class: From Alfred Deakin to John Howard. Cambridge University Press. ISBN 1-139-43720-8.
- Dutton, David (2002). One of Us? A Century of Australian Citizenship. UNSW Press. ISBN 0-868-40556-6.
- Jupp, James (2004). The English in Australia. Cambridge University Press. ISBN 0-521-54295-2.
- Mosler, David; Catley, Robert (1998). America and Americans in Australia. Greenwood Publishing Group. ISBN 0-275-96252-0.
- Reekie, Gail (1998). Measuring Immorality: Social Inquiry and the Problem of Illegitimacy. Cambridge University Press. ISBN 978-0-521-62974-4.
