= Electoral results for the district of Richmond (Victoria) =

Victoria, Australia, district election results

This is a list of electoral results for the electoral district of Richmond in Victorian state elections.

== Members for Richmond ==
1856–1904, 2 members
Member 1	Party	Term	Member 2	Party	Term
George Evans	Unaligned	1856 – 1859	Daniel Campbell	Unaligned	1856 – 1859
James Francis	Unaligned	1859 – 1874	Alfred Woolley	Unaligned	1859 – 1861
James Francis	Unaligned	1859 – 1874	Thomas Lambert	Unaligned	1861 – 1864
James Francis	Unaligned	1859 – 1874	Archibald Wardrop	Unaligned	1864 – 1866
James Francis	Unaligned	1859 – 1874	Ambrose Kyte	Unaligned	1867^{[b]} – 1867
James Francis	Unaligned	1859 – 1874	James Harcourt	Unaligned	1868 – 1871
James Francis	Unaligned	1859 – 1874	Louis Smith	Unaligned	1871 – 1874
Joseph Bosisto	Unaligned	1874^{[b]} – 1889	Robert Inglis	Unaligned	1874 – 1877
Joseph Bosisto	Unaligned	1874^{[b]} – 1889	Louis Smith	Unaligned	1877 – 1880
Joseph Bosisto	Unaligned	1874^{[b]} – 1889	William Walker	Unaligned	1880
Joseph Bosisto	Unaligned	1874^{[b]} – 1889	Louis Smith	Unaligned	1880 – 1883
Joseph Bosisto	Unaligned	1874^{[b]} – 1889	Charles Smith	Unaligned	1883 – 1889
George Bennett	Unaligned	1889 – 1908			
George Bennett	Unaligned	1889 – 1908	William Trenwith	Labor	1889 – 1903
George Bennett	Unaligned	1889 – 1908	George Roberts	Labor	1903^{[b]} – 1904
1904–present, 1 member
Ted Cotter	Labor	1908^{[b]} – 1945			
Stan Keon	Labor	1945 – 1949			
Frank Scully	Labor	1949^{[b]} – 1955			
Frank Scully	Democratic Labor	1955 – 1958			
Bill Towers	Labor	1958 – 1962			
Clyde Holding	Labor	1962^{[b]} – 1977			
Theo Sidiropoulos	Labor	1977^{[b]} – 1988			
Demetri Dollis	Labor	1988 – 1999			
Richard Wynne	Labor	1999 – 2022			
Gabrielle de Vietri	Greens	2022 – Present			

^{b} = by-election

== Election results ==
=== Elections in the 2020s ===
==== 2022 ====
2022 Victorian state election: Richmond
Party	Candidate	Votes	%	±%
Greens	Gabrielle de Vietri	13,771	34.7	+1.2
Labor	Lauren O'Dwyer	13,037	32.8	−11.6
Liberal	Lucas Moon	7,456	18.8	+18.8
Reason	Jeremy Cowen	1,830	4.6	−2.0
Victorian Socialists	Roz Ward	1,828	4.6	+4.6
Animal Justice	Lis Viggers	934	2.3	−0.5
Family First	Markus Freiverts	458	1.2	+1.2
Independent	Meca Ho	417	1.0	+1.0
Total formal votes		39,731	96.6	+2.5
Informal votes		1,381	3.4	−2.5
Turnout		41,112	85.1	−0.4
Notional two-party-preferred count
Labor	Lauren O'Dwyer	29,451	74.1	−7.1
Liberal	Lucas Moon	10,280	25.9	+7.1
Two-candidate-preferred result
Greens	Gabrielle de Vietri	22,771	57.2	+14.1
Labor	Lauren O'Dwyer	17,012	42.8	−14.1
Greens gain from Labor		Swing	+14.1	

=== Elections in the 2010s ===
==== 2018 ====
2018 Victorian state election: Richmond
Party	Candidate	Votes	%	±%
Labor	Richard Wynne	19,705	44.39	+11.10
Greens	Kathleen Maltzahn	15,197	34.23	+2.77
Reason	Judy Ryan	2,916	6.57	+3.24
Independent Liberal	Kevin Quoc Tran	2,698	6.08	+6.08
Independent	Herschel Landes	1,340	3.02	+3.02
Animal Justice	Craig Kealy	1,268	2.86	+1.41
Independent	Emma Manning	811	1.83	+1.83
Independent	Adrian Whitehead	459	1.03	+1.03
Total formal votes		44,394	94.10	−2.18
Informal votes		2,783	5.90	+2.18
Turnout		47,177	86.28	−2.93
Two-candidate-preferred result
Labor	Richard Wynne	24,620	55.46	+3.60
Greens	Kathleen Maltzahn	19,774	44.54	−3.60
Labor hold		Swing	+3.60	

==== 2014 ====
2014 Victorian state election: Richmond
Party	Candidate	Votes	%	±%
Labor	Richard Wynne	13,349	33.3	−3.9
Greens	Kathleen Maltzahn	12,615	31.5	+2.9
Liberal	Weiran Lu	8,308	20.7	−2.0
Independent Socialist	Stephen Jolly	3,407	8.5	−0.2
Sex Party	Nevena Spirovska	1,336	3.3	+0.5
Animal Justice	Miranda Smith	578	1.4	+1.4
Family First	Sarah Knight	317	0.8	+0.8
Independent	Tom Keel	192	0.5	+0.5
Total formal votes		40,102	96.3	−0.1
Informal votes		1,550	3.7	+0.1
Turnout		41,652	89.2	+1.4
Notional two-party-preferred count
Labor	Richard Wynne	29,303	73.1	+2.7
Liberal	Weiran Lu	10,799	26.9	−2.7
Two-candidate-preferred result
Labor	Richard Wynne	20,798	51.9	−4.5
Greens	Kathleen Maltzahn	19,304	48.1	+4.5
Labor hold		Swing	−4.5	

==== 2010 ====
2010 Victorian state election: Richmond
Party	Candidate	Votes	%	±%
Labor	Richard Wynne	13,328	37.26	−9.15
Greens	Kathleen Maltzahn	10,174	28.44	+3.76
Liberal	Tom McFeely	8,154	22.79	+2.91
Independent	Stephen Jolly	3,097	8.66	+3.02
Sex Party	Angela White	1,020	2.85	+2.85
Total formal votes		35,773	96.37	+0.80
Informal votes		1,348	3.63	−0.80
Turnout		37,121	88.33	+2.01
Notional two-party-preferred count
Labor	Richard Wynne	25,130	70.25	−4.92
Liberal	Tom McFeely	10,643	29.75	+4.92
Two-candidate-preferred result
Labor	Richard Wynne	20,212	56.46	+1.58
Greens	Kathleen Maltzahn	15,589	43.54	−1.58
Labor hold		Swing	+1.58	

=== Elections in the 2000s ===
==== 2006 ====
2006 Victorian state election: Richmond
Party	Candidate	Votes	%	±%
Labor	Richard Wynne	14,855	46.4	−1.1
Greens	Gurm Sekhon	7,900	24.7	−3.9
Liberal	Maina Walkley	6,365	19.9	+0.1
Independent	Stephen Jolly	1,805	5.6	+3.6
People Power	Richard Grummet	497	1.6	+1.6
Family First	Ann Bown Seeley	443	1.4	+1.4
Independent	Luke Watts	146	0.5	+0.5
Total formal votes		32,011	95.6	−1.2
Informal votes		1,485	4.4	+1.2
Turnout		33,496	86.0	
Notional two-party-preferred count
Labor	Richard Wynne	24,060	75.2	−0.4
Liberal	Maina Walkley	7,948	24.8	+0.4
Two-candidate-preferred result
Labor	Richard Wynne	17,170	53.6	+0.5
Greens	Gurm Sekhon	14,841	46.4	−0.5
Labor hold		Swing	+0.5	

==== 2002 ====
2002 Victorian state election: Richmond
Party	Candidate	Votes	%	±%
Labor	Richard Wynne	15,016	47.5	−9.5
Greens	Gemma Pinnell	9,055	28.6	+28.6
Liberal	Paul Teiwes	6,251	19.8	−11.4
Independent	Paul Mees	668	2.1	+2.1
Independent	Stephen Jolly	629	2.0	−9.8
Total formal votes		31,619	96.7	+0.4
Informal votes		1,063	3.3	−0.4
Turnout		32,682	88.2	
Notional two-party-preferred count
Labor	Richard Wynne	23,933	75.5	+9.8
Liberal	Paul Teiwes	7,747	24.5	−9.8
Two-candidate-preferred result
Labor	Richard Wynne	16,787	53.1	−12.6
Greens	Gemma Pinnell	14,832	46.9	+46.9
Labor hold		Swing	−12.6	

=== Elections in the 1990s ===
==== 1999 ====
1999 Victorian state election: Richmond
Party	Candidate	Votes	%	±%
Labor	Richard Wynne	20,121	57.4	−4.8
Liberal	Duc Dung Tran	10,716	30.6	+0.6
Independent	Stephen Jolly	4,213	12.0	+12.0
Total formal votes		35,050	96.3	−0.9
Informal votes		1,348	3.7	+0.9
Turnout		36,398	87.8	
Two-party-preferred result
Labor	Richard Wynne	23,204	66.2	−1.1
Liberal	Duc Dung Tran	11,837	33.8	+1.1
Labor hold		Swing	−1.1	

==== 1996 ====
1996 Victorian state election: Richmond
Party	Candidate	Votes	%	±%
Labor	Demetri Dollis	21,216	62.2	+8.9
Liberal	Sunny Duong	10,215	29.9	+1.3
Independent	Dave Mizon	1,604	4.7	+4.7
Natural Law	Larry Clarke	1,095	3.2	+3.2
Total formal votes		34,130	97.2	+4.1
Informal votes		991	2.8	−4.1
Turnout		35,121	89.1	
Two-party-preferred result
Labor	Demetri Dollis	22,902	67.3	+4.0
Liberal	Sunny Duong	11,103	32.7	−4.0
Labor hold		Swing	+4.0	

==== 1992 ====
1992 Victorian state election: Richmond
Party	Candidate	Votes	%	±%
Labor	Demetri Dollis	15,945	53.3	−7.8
Liberal	Peter Graham	8,554	28.6	+5.5
Independent	Geoff Millman	1,322	4.4	+4.4
Democrats	Gordon McQuilten	1,193	4.0	+4.0
Independent	Sunny Seau	691	2.3	+2.3
Natural Law	Larry Clarke	464	1.6	+1.6
Independent	Barry Gration	452	1.5	+1.5
Independent	Jason Maher	409	1.4	+1.4
Independent	Bill Hampson	396	1.3	−3.7
Independent	Steve Florin	373	1.2	−2.8
Independent	Ray Fulcher	127	0.4	+0.4
Total formal votes		29,926	93.1	+0.6
Informal votes		2,224	6.9	−0.6
Turnout		32,150	91.5	
Two-party-preferred result
Labor	Demetri Dollis	18,858	63.3	−4.1
Liberal	Peter Graham	10,939	36.7	+4.1
Labor hold		Swing	−4.1	

=== Elections in the 1980s ===
==== 1988 ====
1988 Victorian state election: Richmond
Party	Candidate	Votes	%	±%
Labor	Demetri Dollis	14,630	60.42	−10.99
Liberal	David Monk	5,452	22.51	−6.08
Democratic Labor	John Mulholland	1,626	6.71	+6.71
Independent	Bill Hampson	1,395	5.76	+5.76
Independent	Steve Florin	1,112	4.59	+4.59
Total formal votes		24,215	92.43	−2.80
Informal votes		1,984	7.57	+2.80
Turnout		26,199	86.11	−0.96
Two-party-preferred result
Labor	Demetri Dollis	16,273	67.28	−4.13
Liberal	David Monk	7,915	32.72	+4.13
Labor hold		Swing	−4.13	

==== 1985 ====
1985 Victorian state election: Richmond
Party	Candidate	Votes	%	±%
Labor	Theo Sidiropoulos	18,396	71.4	+2.1
Liberal	John Sevior	7,366	28.6	+10.0
Total formal votes		25,762	95.2	
Informal votes		1,290	4.8	
Turnout		27,052	87.1	
Labor hold		Swing	−6.5	

==== 1982 ====
1982 Victorian state election: Richmond
Party	Candidate	Votes	%	±%
Labor	Theo Sidiropoulos	16,680	69.3	+4.5
Liberal	Jordan Topalides	4,473	18.6	−2.3
Democrats	Bruce Errol	2,915	12.1	−0.4
Total formal votes		24,068	95.9	+1.3
Informal votes		1,034	4.1	−1.3
Turnout		25,102	87.8	+0.4
Two-party-preferred result
Labor	Theo Sidiropoulos	18,354	76.3	+5.9
Liberal	Jordan Topalides	5,714	23.7	−5.9
Labor hold		Swing	+5.9	

=== Elections in the 1970s ===
==== 1979 ====
1979 Victorian state election: Richmond
Party	Candidate	Votes	%	±%
Labor	Theo Sidiropoulos	15,495	64.8	−6.1
Liberal	Wendy Leigh	4,987	20.9	−5.4
Democrats	Vivian Keating	2,995	12.5	+12.5
Independent	Astridis Lalopoulos	430	1.8	+1.8
Total formal votes		23,907	94.6	−1.5
Informal votes		1,356	5.4	+1.5
Turnout		25,263	87.4	−0.1
Two-party-preferred result
Labor	Theo Sidiropoulos	16,830	70.4	−2.9
Liberal	Wendy Leigh	7,077	29.6	+2.9
Labor hold		Swing	−2.9	

==== 1977 by-election ====
1977 Richmond state by-election
Party	Candidate	Votes	%	±%
Labor	Theo Sidiropoulos	12,398	59.4	−11.5
Liberal	Paul Coughlin	5,173	24.8	−1.5
Democrats	Vivian Keating	3,311	15.9	+15.9
Total formal votes		20,882	96.9	+0.8
Informal votes		671	3.1	−0.8
Turnout		21,553	72.4	−15.1
Labor hold		Swing	N/A	

- Preferences were not distributed

==== 1976 ====
1976 Victorian state election: Richmond
Party	Candidate	Votes	%	±%
Labor	Clyde Holding	18,340	70.9	+6.3
Liberal	John Rush	6,804	26.3	+3.6
Independent	Andrew Jamieson	732	2.8	+2.8
Total formal votes		25,876	96.1	
Informal votes		1,050	3.9	
Turnout		26,926	87.5	
Two-party-preferred result
Labor	Clyde Holding	18,963	73.3	+6.8
Liberal	John Rush	6,913	26.7	−6.8
Labor hold		Swing	+6.8	

==== 1973 ====
1973 Victorian state election: Richmond
Party	Candidate	Votes	%	±%
Labor	Clyde Holding	11,612	64.4	+0.6
Liberal	Roger Frankel	4,001	22.2	+4.6
Democratic Labor	Henry Bader	2,426	13.4	−0.5
Total formal votes		18,039	94.1	+1.2
Informal votes		1,137	5.9	−1.2
Turnout		19,176	87.7	−4.2
Two-party-preferred result
Labor	Clyde Holding	11,976	66.4	−1.9
Liberal	Roger Frankel	6,063	33.6	+1.9
Labor hold		Swing	−1.9	

==== 1970 ====
1970 Victorian state election: Richmond
Party	Candidate	Votes	%	±%
Labor	Clyde Holding	11,629	63.8	+2.4
Liberal	Ronald Turner	3,204	17.6	+1.5
Democratic Labor	Terence Scully	2,531	13.9	−8.5
Total formal votes		18,221	92.9	−1.0
Informal votes		1,381	7.1	+1.0
Turnout		19,602	91.9	+0.6
Two-party-preferred result
Labor	Clyde Holding	12,437	68.3	+3.5
Liberal	Ronald Turner	5,784	31.7	−3.5
Labor hold		Swing	+3.5	

=== Elections in the 1960s ===
==== 1967 ====
1967 Victorian state election: Richmond
Party	Candidate	Votes	%	±%
Labor	Clyde Holding	12,435	61.4	−1.9
Democratic Labor	James Abikhair	4,541	22.4	+3.6
Liberal	Graham Jackson	3,265	16.1	−1.0
Total formal votes		20,241	93.9	
Informal votes		1,308	6.1	
Turnout		21,549	91.3	
Two-party-preferred result
Labor	Clyde Holding	13,116	64.8	−1.6
Liberal	Graham Jackson	7,125	35.2	+1.6
Labor hold		Swing	−1.6	

- The two candidate preferred vote was not counted between the Labor and DLP candidates for Richmond.

==== 1964 ====
1964 Victorian state election: Richmond
Party	Candidate	Votes	%	±%
Labor	Clyde Holding	9,027	63.1	+2.1
Democratic Labor	Sydney Tutton	2,786	19.5	−6.3
Liberal and Country	Leon Bram	2,505	17.5	+9.4
Total formal votes		14,318	95.3	+0.9
Informal votes		704	4.7	−0.9
Turnout		15,022	92.9	+1.4
Two-party-preferred result
Labor	Clyde Holding	9,446	66.0	−3.5
Liberal and Country	Leon Bram	4,872	34.0	+3.5
Labor hold		Swing	−3.5	

- The two candidate preferred vote was not counted between the Labor and DLP candidates for Richmond

==== 1962 by-election ====
1962 Richmond state by-election
Party	Candidate	Votes	%	±%
Labor	Clyde Holding	9,347	65.9	+4.9
Democratic Labor	Leo Gardiner	3,802	26.8	+1.0
Independent	Stirling Davis	897	6.3	+6.3
Independent	John Murray	129	0.9	+0.9
Total formal votes		14,175	96.1	+1.7
Informal votes		569	3.9	−1.7
Turnout		14,744	84.0	−7.5
Labor hold		Swing	N/A	

==== 1961 ====
1961 Victorian state election: Richmond
Party	Candidate	Votes	%	±%
Labor	Bill Towers	9,281	61.0	+7.9
Democratic Labor	Leo Gardner	3,922	25.8	−9.4
Liberal and Country	John Ridge	1,236	8.1	−2.8
Communist	Harry Bocquet	789	5.2	+5.2
Total formal votes		15,228	94.4	−2.7
Informal votes		905	5.6	+2.7
Turnout		16,133	91.5	−1.7
Two-party-preferred result
Labor	Bill Towers	10,575	69.5	+10.3
Liberal and Country	John Ridge	4,653	30.5	−10.3
Labor hold		Swing	+10.3	

- The two candidate preferred vote was not counted between the Labor and DLP candidates for Richmond.

=== Elections in the 1950s ===
==== 1958 ====
1958 Victorian state election: Richmond
Party	Candidate	Votes	%	±%
Labor	Bill Towers	9,552	53.9	
Democratic Labor	Frank Scully	6,242	35.2	
Liberal and Country	Nicholas Renton	1,932	10.9	
Total formal votes		18,259	93.2	
Informal votes		533	2.9	
Turnout		18,259	93.2	
Two-candidate-preferred result
Labor	Bill Towers	10,488	59.2	
Democratic Labor	Frank Scully	7,238	40.8	
Labor gain from Democratic Labor		Swing		

- Two candidate preferred vote was estimated.

==== 1955 ====
1955 Victorian state election: Richmond
Party	Candidate	Votes	%	±%
Labor (A-C)	Frank Scully	6,159	40.4	
Labor	Patrick O'Connell	5,967	39.2	
Liberal and Country	Barry Dove	2,622	17.2	
Communist	Kenneth Miller	484	3.2	
Total formal votes		15,232	95.9	
Informal votes		647	4.1	
Turnout		15,879	95.2	
Two-candidate-preferred result
Labor (A-C)	Frank Scully	8,053	52.9	
Labor	Patrick O'Connell	7,179	47.1	
Labor (A-C) gain from Labor		Swing		

==== 1952 ====
1952 Victorian state election: Richmond
Party	Candidate	Votes	%	±%
Labor	Frank Scully	18,474	90.2	+15.7
Communist	Kenneth Miller	2,016	9.8	+3.4
Total formal votes		20,490	96.2	−1.4
Informal votes		814	3.8	+1.4
Turnout		21,304	93.4	−2.0
Labor hold		Swing	N/A	

==== 1950 ====
1950 Victorian state election: Richmond
Party	Candidate	Votes	%	±%
Labor	Frank Scully	17,569	74.5	+1.5
Liberal and Country	Ralph Skinner	4,504	19.1	−7.9
Communist	Ken Miller	1,510	6.4	+6.4
Total formal votes		23,583	97.6	−0.6
Informal votes		567	2.4	+0.6
Turnout		24,150	95.4	+1.3
Two-party-preferred result
Labor	Frank Scully	18,928	80.3	+7.3
Liberal and Country	Ralph Skinner	4,655	19.7	−7.3
Labor hold		Swing	+7.3	

=== Elections in the 1940s ===
==== 1949 by-election ====
1949 Richmond state by-election
Party	Candidate	Votes	%	±%
Labor	Frank Scully	17,159	77.4	+4.4
Liberal and Country	Michael McNamara	4,996	22.6	−4.4
Total formal votes		22,155	98.0	−0.2
Informal votes		460	2.0	+0.2
Turnout		22,615	88.4	−5.7
Labor hold		Swing	+4.4	

==== 1947 ====
1947 Victorian state election: Richmond
Party	Candidate	Votes	%	±%
Labor	Stan Keon	18,233	73.0	−2.9
Liberal	Roland Leckie	6,736	27.0	+27.0
Total formal votes		24,969	98.2	+4.2
Informal votes		465	1.8	−4.2
Turnout		25,434	94.1	+7.5
Labor hold		Swing	N/A	

==== 1945 ====
1945 Victorian state election: Richmond
Party	Candidate	Votes	%	±%
Labor	Stan Keon	16,621	75.9	
Communist	Bart Flannagan	5,288	24.1	
Total formal votes		21,909	94.0	
Informal votes		1,402	6.0	
Turnout		23,311	86.6	
Labor hold		Swing		

==== 1943 ====
1943 Victorian state election: Richmond
Party	Candidate	Votes	%	±%
Labor	Ted Cotter	14,483	68.4	−31.6
Communist	Bertha Laidler	6,690	31.6	+31.6
Total formal votes		21,173	94.7	
Informal votes		1,191	5.3	
Turnout		22,364	85.5	
Labor hold		Swing	N/A	

==== 1940 ====
1940 Victorian state election: Richmond
Party	Candidate	Votes	%	±%
Labor	Ted Cotter	unopposed		
Labor hold		Swing		

=== Elections in the 1930s ===
==== 1937 ====
1937 Victorian state election: Richmond
Party	Candidate	Votes	%	±%
Labor	Ted Cotter	15,996	69.8	−2.8
Independent	Cecil Lee-Archer	6,908	30.2	+30.2
Total formal votes		22,904	98.4	+0.8
Informal votes		384	1.6	−0.8
Turnout		23,288	92.7	−1.8
Labor hold		Swing	−2.8	

==== 1935 ====
1935 Victorian state election: Richmond
Party	Candidate	Votes	%	±%
Labor	Ted Cotter	16,268	72.6	−27.4
United Australia	Cecil Lee-Archer	6,147	27.4	+27.4
Total formal votes		22,415	97.6	
Informal votes		560	2.4	
Turnout		22,975	94.5	
Labor hold		Swing	N/A	

==== 1932 ====
1932 Victorian state election: Richmond
Party	Candidate	Votes	%	±%
Labor	Ted Cotter	unopposed		
Labor hold		Swing		

=== Elections in the 1920s ===
==== 1929 ====
1929 Victorian state election: Richmond
Party	Candidate	Votes	%	±%
Labor	Ted Cotter	unopposed		
Labor hold		Swing		

==== 1927 ====
1927 Victorian state election: Richmond
Party	Candidate	Votes	%	±%
Labor	Ted Cotter	unopposed		
Labor hold		Swing		

==== 1924 ====
1924 Victorian state election: Richmond
Party	Candidate	Votes	%	±%
Labor	Ted Cotter	unopposed		
Labor hold		Swing		

==== 1921 ====
1921 Victorian state election: Richmond
Party	Candidate	Votes	%	±%
Labor	Ted Cotter	unopposed		
Labor hold		Swing		

==== 1920 ====
1920 Victorian state election: Richmond
Party	Candidate	Votes	%	±%
Labor	Ted Cotter	unopposed		
Labor hold		Swing		

=== Elections in the 1910s ===
==== 1917 ====
1917 Victorian state election: Richmond
Party	Candidate	Votes	%	±%
Labor	Ted Cotter	unopposed		
Labor hold		Swing		

==== 1914 ====
1914 Victorian state election: Richmond
Party	Candidate	Votes	%	±%
Labor	Ted Cotter	6,335	76.3	−0.4
Liberal	Tom Brennan	1,967	23.7	+0.4
Total formal votes		8,302	97.4	−1.4
Informal votes		224	2.6	+1.4
Turnout		8,526	48.9	−6.3
Labor hold		Swing	−0.4	

==== 1911 ====
1911 Victorian state election: Richmond
Party	Candidate	Votes	%	±%
Labor	Ted Cotter	6,063	76.7	+10.3
Liberal	Norman O'Brien	1,838	23.3	+23.3
Total formal votes		7,901	98.8	−1.0
Informal votes		98	1.2	+1.0
Turnout		7,999	55.2	−13.2
Labor hold		Swing	N/A	

=== Elections in the 1900s ===
==== 1908 by-election ====
1908 Richmond state by-election
Party	Candidate	Votes	%	±%
Labor	Ted Cotter	2,046	63.2	+36.4
United Liberal	William Wishart	1,195	36.8	–8.6 (Note: At the 1907 election, ULP candidate George Henry Bennett received 45.4% of the vote, while William Wishart had 27.8% of the vote while contesting as an independent, making their combined vote 73.2% in 1907. If compared to Bennett in 1907, Wishart had a negative swing of 8.6%. If compared to his own 1907 result as an independent, Wishart had a positive swing of 9.0%. If compared to the combined ULP/independent total in 1907, Wishart had a negative swing of 36.4%.)
Total formal votes		3,241	99.8	+0.6
Informal votes		7	0.2	–0.6
Turnout		3,248	63.8	–5.0
Labor gain from United Liberal		Swing		

==== 1907 ====
1907 Victorian state election: Richmond
Party	Candidate	Votes	%	±%
United Liberal	George Henry Bennett	1,576	45.4	−9.0
Independent	William Wishart	966	27.8	+27.8
Labor	Robert Solly	931	26.8	−18.8
Total formal votes		3,473	99.2	
Informal votes		28	0.8	
Turnout		3,501	68.8	
United Liberal hold		Swing	−9.0	
