= Electoral district of Richmond (Victoria) =

State electoral district of Victoria, Australia

Coordinates: 37°48′45″S 144°59′40″E

Richmond Victoria—Legislative Assembly
- Interactive map of electoral district boundaries from the 2022 state election
- State: Victoria
- Created: 1856
- MP: Gabrielle de Vietri
- Party: Greens
- Namesake: Suburb of Richmond
- Electors: 48,305 (2022)
- Area: 13 km^{2} (5.0 sq mi)
- Demographic: Inner metropolitan

Richmond is an electoral district of the Legislative Assembly in the Australian state of Victoria. It is currently a 13 km^{2} electorate in the inner east of Melbourne, encompassing the suburbs of Richmond, Cremorne, Burnley, Abbotsford, Collingwood, Clifton Hill, Fitzroy and Fitzroy North. Historically a very safe seat for the Labor Party, Richmond has in recent elections become increasingly marginal against the Greens, who eventually won the seat at the 2022 Victorian state election.

== History ==
Richmond is one of only three electorates (along with Brighton and Williamstown) to have been contested at every election since 1856. It was initially a two-member electorate, but was changed to a single-member electorate in the redistribution of 1904 when several new districts were created including Abbotsford. It covers a series of traditionally working-class, industrial suburbs, and was continuously held by the Labor Party and Democratic Labor Party between 1904 and 2022. Following the Labor split of 1955, incumbent Labor member, Frank Scully, joined six other Catholic MPs in breaking away to found the Democratic Labor Party. Scully, as the party's leader, was the only MP to hold his seat at the next election. He was defeated in 1958 by Bill Towers, previously the member for the abolished seat of Collingwood.

Labor member Demetri Dollis was disendorsed for extended absence overseas in 1999 and Richard Wynne was preselected by the party instead. Wynne served as the state Minister for Housing and Minister for Local Government in the Bracks and Brumby governments from 2006 to 2010, and was the Minister for Planning in the second Andrews government.

Though a traditionally safe Labor seat, it has become progressively marginal in recent years due to significant gentrification. Support for the Greens has increased as the seat became wealthier. This first occurred at the 2002 state election, when union organiser Gemma Pinnell nearly won the seat on Liberal preferences, taking 47 per cent of the two-party preferred vote. The Green surge was seen as a reaction to the conservative policies of the then federal Labor leader, Kim Beazley. Labor polled slightly better in the 2006 state election, taking 54% of the two-party preferred against Greens candidate and local councillor Gurm Sekhon. It remained a marginal seat and was strongly contested by Greens candidate, Kathleen Maltzahn, at the 2010 and 2014 state elections.

Following Wynne's retirement at the 2022 election, there was fierce contest between Labor and the Greens. Former City of Yarra mayor, Gabrielle de Vietri, was preselected as the Greens candidate. De Vietri won the seat with a 14.1% swing towards the party. This was due to numerous factors such as the loss of Wynne's personal vote and controversy surrounding the Labor candidate's claims of Aboriginal heritage. De Vietri is currently the Greens spokesperson for the Arts and Public Housing.

=== Historical maps ===
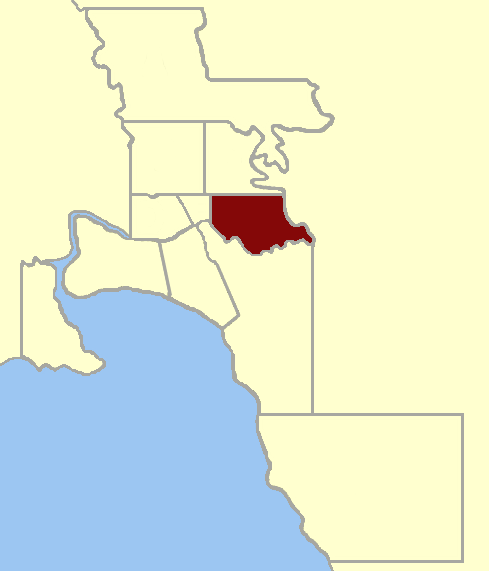
Location within Greater Melbourne area, 1859

Map of Richmond district (etc.), 1856

== Members for Richmond ==
=== Two-member electorate (1856–1904) ===
Image	Member	Party	Term	Notes	Image	Member	Party	Term	Notes
	George Evans (1802–1868)	Unaligned	1 November 1856 – 1 August 1859			Daniel Campbell (1812–1875)	Unaligned	1 November 1856 – 1 August 1859	
	James Francis (1819–1884)	Unaligned	1 October 1859 – 1 November 1874	Premier of Victoria from 1872 until 1874. Resigned		Alfred Woolley (1818–1890)	Unaligned	1 October 1859 – 1 July 1861	
	James Francis (1819–1884)	Unaligned	1 October 1859 – 1 November 1874	Premier of Victoria from 1872 until 1874. Resigned		Thomas Lambert (1829–1877)	Unaligned	1 August 1861 – 1 July 1864	
	James Francis (1819–1884)	Unaligned	1 October 1859 – 1 November 1874	Premier of Victoria from 1872 until 1874. Resigned		Archibald Wardrop (1828–1887)	Unaligned	1 November 1864 – 1 July 1866	Resigned
	James Francis (1819–1884)	Unaligned	1 October 1859 – 1 November 1874	Premier of Victoria from 1872 until 1874. Resigned		Ambrose Kyte (1822–1868)	Unaligned	1 January 1867 – 1 December 1867	Former member for East Melbourne. Won by-election
	James Francis (1819–1884)	Unaligned	1 October 1859 – 1 November 1874	Premier of Victoria from 1872 until 1874. Resigned		James Harcourt (1813–1893)	Unaligned	1 June 1868 – 1 June 1871	
	James Francis (1819–1884)	Unaligned	1 October 1859 – 1 November 1874	Premier of Victoria from 1872 until 1874. Resigned		Louis Smith (1830–1910)	Unaligned	1 April 1871 – 1 March 1874	
	James Francis (1819–1884)	Unaligned	1 October 1859 – 1 November 1874	Premier of Victoria from 1872 until 1874. Resigned		Robert Inglis (1833–1915)	Unaligned	1 May 1874 – 1 April 1877	
	Joseph Bosisto (1827–1898)	Unaligned	1 December 1874 – 1 March 1889			Robert Inglis (1833–1915)	Unaligned	1 May 1874 – 1 April 1877	
	Joseph Bosisto (1827–1898)	Unaligned	1 December 1874 – 1 March 1889			Louis Smith (1830–1910)	Unaligned	1 May 1877 – 1 February 1880	
	Joseph Bosisto (1827–1898)	Unaligned	1 December 1874 – 1 March 1889			William Froggatt Walker (1840–1890)	Unaligned	1 May 1880 – 1 June 1880	
	Joseph Bosisto (1827–1898)	Unaligned	1 December 1874 – 1 March 1889			Louis Smith (1830–1910)	Unaligned	1 July 1880 – 1 February 1883	
	Joseph Bosisto (1827–1898)	Unaligned	1 December 1874 – 1 March 1889			Charles Smith (1833–1903)	Unaligned	1 February 1883 – 1 March 1889	
	George Henry Bennett (1850–1908)	Unaligned	1 April 1889 – 1 June 1904	Re-elected when Richmond became single-member seat in 1904					
	George Henry Bennett (1850–1908)	Unaligned	1 April 1889 – 1 June 1904	Re-elected when Richmond became single-member seat in 1904		William Trenwith (1846–1925)	Labor	1 April 1889 – 18 November 1903	First leader of the Victorian Labor Party. Resigned to successfully contest 1903 federal election and served as senator for Victoria from 1904 until 1910
	George Henry Bennett (1850–1908)	Unaligned	1 April 1889 – 1 June 1904	Re-elected when Richmond became single-member seat in 1904		George Roberts (1868–1925)	Labor	21 December 1903 – 1 June 1904	Lost seat when Richmond became single-member seat in 1904

=== Single-member electorate (1904–present) ===
Image	Member	Party	Term	Notes
	George Henry Bennett (1850–1908)	Liberal Oppositionist	1 June 1904 – 14 February 1907	Died in office
	George Henry Bennett (1850–1908)	United Liberal	14 February 1907 – 8 September 1908	Died in office
	Ted Cotter (1866–1947)	Labor	2 October 1908 – 10 November 1945	Won by-election. Retired after losing Labor preselection
	Stan Keon (1915–1987)	Labor	10 November 1945 – 22 October 1949	Resigned to successfully contest Yarra at the 1949 federal election
	Frank Scully (1920–2015)	Labor	17 December 1949 – 30 March 1955	Won by-election. Joined Labor (Anti-Communist) after being suspended from Labor. Lost seat
	Frank Scully (1920–2015)	Labor (Anti-Communist)	30 March 1955 – 18 August 1957	Won by-election. Joined Labor (Anti-Communist) after being suspended from Labor. Lost seat
	Frank Scully (1920–2015)	Democratic Labor	18 August 1957 – 31 May 1958	Won by-election. Joined Labor (Anti-Communist) after being suspended from Labor. Lost seat
	Bill Towers (1892–1962)	Labor	31 May 1958 – 18 March 1962	Died in office
	Clyde Holding (1931–2011)	Labor	12 May 1962 – 3 November 1977	Won by-election. Leader of the Opposition from 1967 until 1977. Resigned to successfully contest Melbourne Ports at the 1977 federal election
	Theo Sidiropoulos (1924–1998)	Labor	17 December 1977 – 1 October 1988	Won by-election. First Greek-born member of the Parliament of Victoria. Retired
	Demetri Dollis (1956–)	Labor	1 October 1988 – 18 September 1999	Deputy Leader of the Opposition from 1994 until 1996. Disendorsed for extended absence overseas. Later served as Deputy Minister for Foreign Affairs of Greece
	Richard Wynne (1955–)	Labor	18 September 1999 – 26 November 2022	Retired
	Gabrielle de Vietri (1983–)	Greens	26 November 2022 – present	Incumbent

== Election results ==
2022 Victorian state election: Richmond
Party	Candidate	Votes	%	±%
Greens	Gabrielle de Vietri	13,771	34.7	+1.2
Labor	Lauren O'Dwyer	13,037	32.8	−11.6
Liberal	Lucas Moon	7,456	18.8	+18.8
Reason	Jeremy Cowen	1,830	4.6	−2.0
Victorian Socialists	Roz Ward	1,828	4.6	+4.6
Animal Justice	Lis Viggers	934	2.3	−0.5
Family First	Markus Freiverts	458	1.2	+1.2
Independent	Meca Ho	417	1.0	+1.0
Total formal votes		39,731	96.6	+2.5
Informal votes		1,381	3.4	−2.5
Turnout		41,112	85.1	−0.4
Notional two-party-preferred count
Labor	Lauren O'Dwyer	29,451	74.1	−7.1
Liberal	Lucas Moon	10,280	25.9	+7.1
Two-candidate-preferred result
Greens	Gabrielle de Vietri	22,771	57.2	+14.1
Labor	Lauren O'Dwyer	17,012	42.8	−14.1
Greens gain from Labor		Swing	+14.1	
