= 1908 Richmond state by-election =

- 2 October 1908

Electoral district of Richmond in the Victorian Legislative Assembly
- Registered: 5,091
- Turnout: 63.8% (▼5.0)
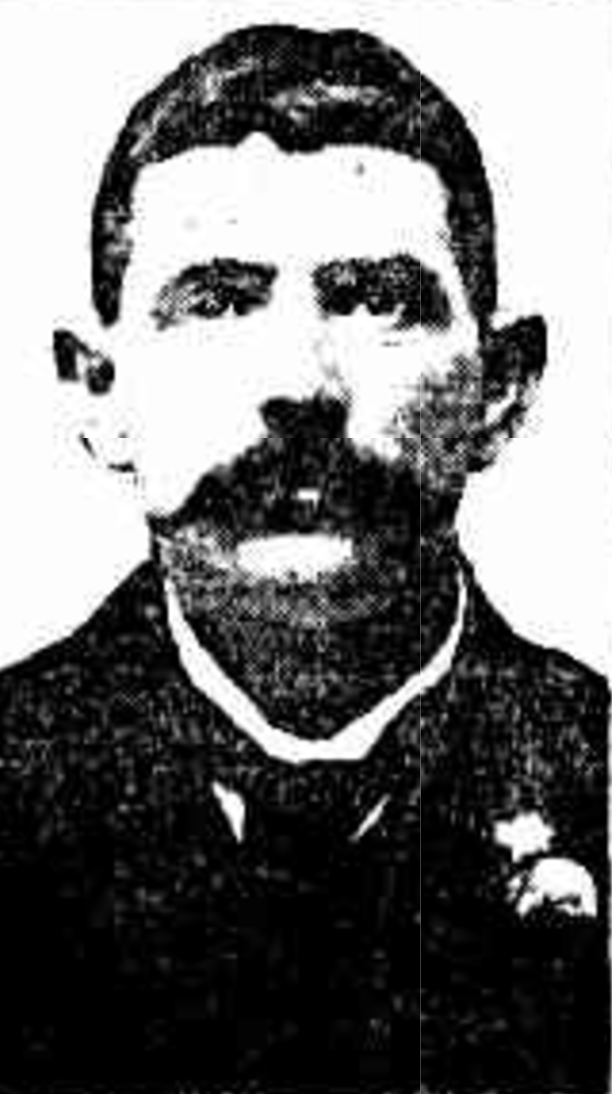

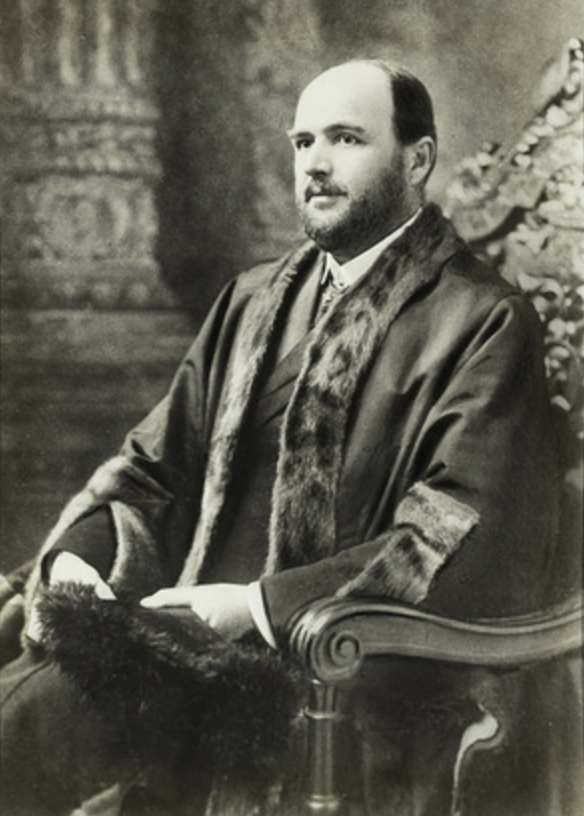
| | First party | Second party |
|---|---|---|
| Candidate | Ted Cotter | William Wishart |
| Party | Labor | United Liberal |
| Popular vote | 2,046 | 1,195 |
| Percentage | 63.2% | 36.8% |
| Swing | ▲63.2 | ▼8.6 (Note: At the 1907 election, ULP candidate George Henry Bennett received 45.4% of the vote, while William Wishart had 27.8% of the vote while contesting as an independent, making their combined vote 73.2% in 1907. If compared to Bennett in 1907, Wishart had a negative swing of 8.6%. If compared to his own 1907 result as an independent, Wishart had a positive swing of 9.0%. If compared to the combined ULP/independent total in 1907, Wishart had a negative swing of 36.4%.) |
MP before election
George Henry Bennett
United Liberal
Elected MP
Ted Cotter
Labor

The 1908 Richmond state by-election was held on 2 October 1908 to elect the member for Richmond in the Victorian Legislative Assembly, following the death of United Liberal Party (ULP) MP George Henry Bennett.

Labor candidate Ted Cotter won the seat with a swing of more than 36%, defeating ULP candidate William Wishart. Cotter was re-elected two months later at the state election on 29 December 1908, and continued to be re-elected (including unopposed between 1917 and 1932) until he lost Labor preselection and retired in 1945.

== Key events ==
- 8 September 1908 – George Henry Bennett dies
- 15 September 1908 – Writ of election issued by the Speaker of the Legislative Assembly
- 24 September 1908 – Candidate nominations close
- 2 October 1908 – Polling day
- 6 October 1908 – Return of writ

== Candidates ==
Candidates are listed in the order they appeared on the ballot.

| Party | Candidate | Background |
|---|---|---|
| Labor | Ted Cotter | Secretary of the Coopers' Union |
| United Liberal | William Wishart | Kew councillor, former mayor, and independent candidate for Richmond in 1907 |

== Results ==
1908 Richmond state by-election
| Party | Candidate | Votes | % | ±% |
|---|---|---|---|---|
| Labor | Ted Cotter | 2,046 | 63.2 | +36.4 |
| United Liberal | William Wishart | 1,195 | 36.8 | –8.6 |
| Total formal votes | | 3,241 | 99.8 | +0.6 |
| Informal votes | | 7 | 0.2 | –0.6 |
| Turnout | | 3,248 | 63.8 | –5.0 |
| Labor gain from United Liberal | | Swing | | |

== See also ==
- Electoral results for the district of Richmond (Victoria)
- List of Victorian state by-elections
