= Electoral results for the Division of Yarra =

Australian division election results

This is a list of electoral results for the Division of Yarra in Australian federal elections from the division's creation in 1901 until its abolition in 1969.

== Members ==
Member	Party	Term
Frank Tudor	Labor	1901–1922
James Scullin	Labor	1922–1949
Stan Keon	Labor	1949–1955
Stan Keon	Labor (A-C)	1955
Dr Jim Cairns	Labor	1955–1969

== Election results ==
=== Elections in the 1960s ===
==== 1966 ====
1966 Australian federal election: Yarra
Party	Candidate	Votes	%	±%
Labor	Jim Cairns	14,352	48.8	−7.2
Liberal	Lionel Hawkins	9,381	31.9	+3.1
Democratic Labor	Stan Keon	4,110	14.0	−1.2
Independent	Bruno Bonomo	1,564	5.3	+5.3
Total formal votes		29,407	94.9	
Informal votes		1,594	5.1	
Turnout		31,001	93.5	
Two-party-preferred result
Labor	Jim Cairns		53.6	−3.9
Liberal	Lionel Hawkins		46.4	+3.9
Labor hold		Swing	−3.9	

==== 1963 ====
1963 Australian federal election: Yarra
Party	Candidate	Votes	%	±%
Labor	Jim Cairns	17,976	56.0	+3.9
Liberal	Anthony Hearder	9,234	28.8	+3.5
Democratic Labor	Stan Keon	4,865	15.2	−1.6
Total formal votes		32,075	98.0	
Informal votes		662	2.0	
Turnout		32,737	94.6	
Two-party-preferred result
Labor	Jim Cairns		57.5	−0.4
Liberal	Anthony Hearder		42.5	+0.4
Labor hold		Swing	−0.4	

==== 1961 ====
1961 Australian federal election: Yarra
Party	Candidate	Votes	%	±%
Labor	Jim Cairns	17,137	52.1	−1.5
Liberal	Andrew Peacock	8,341	25.3	+1.6
Democratic Labor	Stan Keon	5,535	16.8	−4.4
Centre	Geoffrey Broomhall	1,345	4.1	+4.1
Communist	Ken Miller	564	1.7	+0.2
Total formal votes		32,922	95.3	
Informal votes		1,620	4.7	
Turnout		34,542	93.2	
Two-party-preferred result
Labor	Jim Cairns		57.9	+0.8
Liberal	Andrew Peacock		42.1	−0.8
Labor hold		Swing	+0.8	

=== Elections in the 1950s ===
==== 1958 ====
1958 Australian federal election: Yarra
Party	Candidate	Votes	%	±%
Labor	Jim Cairns	19,218	53.6	+6.1
Liberal	Cecil Lanyon	8,505	23.7	+0.4
Democratic Labor	Stan Keon	7,600	21.2	−5.9
Communist	Ken Miller	524	1.5	−0.5
Total formal votes		35,847	96.4	
Informal votes		1,346	3.6	
Turnout		37,193	94.6	
Two-party-preferred result
Labor	Jim Cairns		57.1	+6.1
Liberal	Cecil Lanyon		42.9	+42.9
Labor hold		Swing	+6.1	

==== 1955 ====
1955 Australian federal election: Yarra
Party	Candidate	Votes	%	±%
Labor	Jim Cairns	18,363	47.5	−19.1
Labor (A-C)	Stan Keon	10,492	27.1	+27.1
Liberal	James Wilkie	9,016	23.3	−6.8
Communist	Ken Miller	792	2.0	−1.2
Total formal votes		38,663	95.6	
Informal votes		1,796	4.4	
Turnout		40,459	93.6	
Two-party-preferred result
Labor	Jim Cairns	19,727	51.0	−18.6
Labor (A-C)	Stan Keon	18,936	49.0	+49.0
Labor hold		Swing	−18.6	

==== 1954 ====
1954 Australian federal election: Yarra
Party	Candidate	Votes	%	±%
Labor	Stan Keon	21,058	62.3	+2.2
Liberal	Jim MacDonald	11,591	34.3	−1.4
Communist	Ken Miller	1,139	3.4	−0.8
Total formal votes		33,788	98.3	
Informal votes		578	1.7	
Turnout		34,366	95.3	
Two-party-preferred result
Labor	Stan Keon		65.4	+1.5
Liberal	Jim MacDonald		34.6	−1.5
Labor hold		Swing	+1.5	

==== 1951 ====
1951 Australian federal election: Yarra
Party	Candidate	Votes	%	±%
Labor	Stan Keon	23,039	60.1	+1.3
Liberal	Kenneth Bisney	13,668	35.7	−0.2
Communist	Ken Miller	1,619	4.2	+1.4
Total formal votes		38,326	97.7	
Informal votes		883	2.3	
Turnout		39,209	95.6	
Two-party-preferred result
Labor	Stan Keon		63.9	+1.2
Liberal	Kenneth Bisney		36.1	−1.2
Labor hold		Swing	+1.2	

=== Elections in the 1940s ===
==== 1949 ====
1949 Australian federal election: Yarra
Party	Candidate	Votes	%	±%
Labor	Stan Keon	23,211	58.8	−1.8
Liberal	Charles Barrington	14,189	35.9	+2.9
Communist	John Prescott	1,098	2.8	−3.1
Independent	Wenham Vines	991	2.5	+2.5
Total formal votes		39,489	97.5	
Informal votes		1,018	2.5	
Turnout		40,507	95.4	
Two-party-preferred result
Labor	Stan Keon		62.7	−3.7
Liberal	Charles Barrington		37.3	+3.7
Labor hold		Swing	−3.7	

==== 1946 ====
1946 Australian federal election: Yarra
Party	Candidate	Votes	%	±%
Labor	James Scullin	39,880	63.7	+3.3
Liberal	Kenneth Bisney	18,934	30.2	+11.6
Communist	Ken Miller	3,838	6.1	−4.7
Total formal votes		62,652	96.6	
Informal votes		2,221	3.4	
Turnout		64,873	93.1	
Two-party-preferred result
Labor	James Scullin		69.3	−5.0
Liberal	Kenneth Bisney		30.7	+5.0
Labor hold		Swing	−5.0	

==== 1943 ====
1943 Australian federal election: Yarra
Party	Candidate	Votes	%	±%
Labor	James Scullin	36,709	60.4	+3.0
United Australia	Gilbert Jenkin	11,294	18.6	−14.9
Communist	Ralph Gibson	6,585	10.8	+10.8
Services and Citizens	William Jinkins	5,138	8.5	+8.5
Independent	Allan MacDonald	1,065	1.8	+1.8
Total formal votes		60,791	95.9	
Informal votes		2,632	4.1	
Turnout		63,423	94.9	
Two-party-preferred result
Labor	James Scullin		74.3	+8.7
United Australia	Gilbert Jenkin		25.7	−8.7
Labor hold		Swing	+8.7	

==== 1940 ====
1940 Australian federal election: Yarra
Party	Candidate	Votes	%	±%
Labor	James Scullin	32,790	57.4	−6.6
United Australia	Fred Edmunds	19,132	33.5	−2.5
Independent	Ralph Gibson	5,175	9.1	+9.1
Total formal votes		57,097	97.0	
Informal votes		1,756	3.0	
Turnout		58,853	94.9	
Two-party-preferred result
Labor	James Scullin		65.6	+1.6
United Australia	Fred Edmunds		34.4	−1.6
Labor hold		Swing	+1.6	

=== Elections in the 1930s ===
==== 1937 ====
1937 Australian federal election: Yarra
Party	Candidate	Votes	%	±%
Labor	James Scullin	37,381	64.0	+9.0
United Australia	Douglas Knight	20,999	36.0	+0.2
Total formal votes		58,380	97.7	
Informal votes		1,393	2.3	
Turnout		59,773	94.7	
Labor hold		Swing	+2.4	

==== 1934 ====
1934 Australian federal election: Yarra
Party	Candidate	Votes	%	±%
Labor	James Scullin	25,601	65.0	+5.1
United Australia	Harold Holt	10,741	27.3	−7.6
Communist	Ernie Thornton	3,072	7.8	+4.9
Total formal votes		39,414	95.2	
Informal votes		1,966	4.8	
Turnout		41,380	93.5	
Two-party-preferred result
Labor	James Scullin		72.1	+8.8
United Australia	Harold Holt		27.9	−8.8
Labor hold		Swing	+8.8	

==== 1931 ====
1931 Australian federal election: Yarra
Party	Candidate	Votes	%	±%
Labor	James Scullin	22,843	59.9	−40.1
United Australia	John Davis	13,284	34.9	+34.9
Communist	Ernie Thornton	1,095	2.9	+2.9
Single Tax League	Patrick Branagan	895	2.3	+2.3
Total formal votes		38,117	93.8	
Informal votes		2,502	6.2	
Turnout		40,619	94.2	
Two-party-preferred result
Labor	James Scullin		63.3	−36.7
United Australia	John Davis		36.7	+36.7
Labor hold		Swing	−36.7	

=== Elections in the 1920s ===
==== 1929 ====
1929 Australian federal election: Yarra
Party	Candidate	Votes	%	±%
Labor	James Scullin	unopposed		
Labor hold		Swing		

==== 1928 ====
1928 Australian federal election: Yarra
Party	Candidate	Votes	%	±%
Labor	James Scullin	28,495	74.8	+0.0
Nationalist	Cecil Keeley	9,618	25.2	+0.0
Total formal votes		38,113	94.7	
Informal votes		2,115	5.3	
Turnout		40,228	93.6	
Labor hold		Swing	+0.0	

==== 1925 ====
1925 Australian federal election: Yarra
Party	Candidate	Votes	%	±%
Labor	James Scullin	31,451	74.8	−3.2
Nationalist	Marcus Towler	10,610	25.2	+3.2
Total formal votes		42,061	97.8	
Informal votes		964	2.2	
Turnout		43,025	91.8	
Labor hold		Swing	−3.2	

==== 1922 ====
1922 Australian federal election: Yarra
Party	Candidate	Votes	%	±%
Labor	James Scullin	17,897	78.0	+8.4
Nationalist	Thomas Fitzgerald	5,042	22.0	−8.4
Total formal votes		22,939	96.4	
Informal votes		864	3.6	
Turnout		23,803	51.2	
Labor hold		Swing	+8.4	

1922 Yarra by-election
Party	Candidate	Votes	%	±%
Labor	James Scullin	12,553	77.7	+7.4
Nationalist	Andrew Davidson	3,473	21.5	−8.2
Independent	Frederick Smyth	129	0.8	+0.8
Total formal votes		16,155	96.5	
Informal votes		590	3.5	
Turnout		16,745	42.8	
Two-party-preferred result
Labor	James Scullin		78.1	+7.8
Nationalist	Andrew Davidson		21.9	−7.8
Labor hold		Swing	+7.8	

=== Elections in the 1910s ===
==== 1919 ====
1919 Australian federal election: Yarra
Party	Candidate	Votes	%	±%
Labor	Frank Tudor	19,843	70.3	−1.0
Nationalist	Andrew Davidson	8,398	29.7	+1.0
Total formal votes		28,241	98.7	
Informal votes		372	1.3	
Turnout		28,613	73.2	
Labor hold		Swing	−1.0	

==== 1917 ====
1917 Australian federal election: Yarra
Party	Candidate	Votes	%	±%
Labor	Frank Tudor	22,358	71.3	−28.7
Nationalist	Charles Copeland	8,993	28.7	+28.7
Total formal votes		31,351	97.5	
Informal votes		805	2.5	
Turnout		32,156	84.1	
Labor hold		Swing	−28.7	

==== 1914 ====
1914 Australian federal election: Yarra
Party	Candidate	Votes	%	±%
Labor	Frank Tudor	unopposed		
Labor hold		Swing		

==== 1913 ====
1913 Australian federal election: Yarra
Party	Candidate	Votes	%	±%
Labor	Frank Tudor	22,168	75.0	−0.2
Liberal	Edwin Purbrick	7,398	25.0	+0.2
Total formal votes		22,168	98.4	
Informal votes		471	1.6	
Turnout		30,037	71.5	
Labor hold		Swing	−0.2	

==== 1910 ====
1910 Australian federal election: Yarra
Party	Candidate	Votes	%	±%
Labour	Frank Tudor	13,549	76.1	+17.8
Liberal	Elizee De Garis	4,258	23.9	+23.9
Total formal votes		17,807	98.9	
Informal votes		189	1.1	
Turnout		17,996	65.2	
Labour hold		Swing	+17.8	

=== Elections in the 1900s ===
==== 1906 ====
1906 Australian federal election: Yarra
Party	Candidate	Votes	%	±%
Labour	Frank Tudor	8,591	58.3	−9.9
Ind. Protectionist	Richard Vale	5,776	39.2	+39.2
Independent Labour	George Roberts	358	2.4	+2.4
Total formal votes		14,725	96.9	
Informal votes		473	3.1	
Turnout		15,198	50.2	
Labour hold		Swing	−8.6	

==== 1903 ====
1903 Australian federal election: Yarra
Party	Candidate	Votes	%	±%
Labour	Frank Tudor	13,930	68.2	+35.1
Protectionist	William Wilson	6,496	31.8	+3.2
Total formal votes		20,426	98.4	
Informal votes		327	1.6	
Turnout		20,753	55.8	
Labour hold		Swing	+15.9	

==== 1901 ====
1901 Australian federal election: Yarra
Party	Candidate	Votes	%	±%
Labour	Frank Tudor	3,174	33.1	+33.1
Protectionist	William Wilson	2,745	28.6	+28.6
Ind. Protectionist	Patrick O'Connor	2,631	27.4	+27.4
Ind. Protectionist	John Gahan	1,043	10.9	+10.9
Total formal votes		9,593	99.0	
Informal votes		97	1.0	
Turnout		9,690	63.8	
Labour win		(new seat)		
