= 1949 Richmond state by-election =

- 17 December 1949

Electoral district of Richmond in the Victorian Legislative Assembly
- Registered: 25,582
- Turnout: 88.4% (▼5.7)
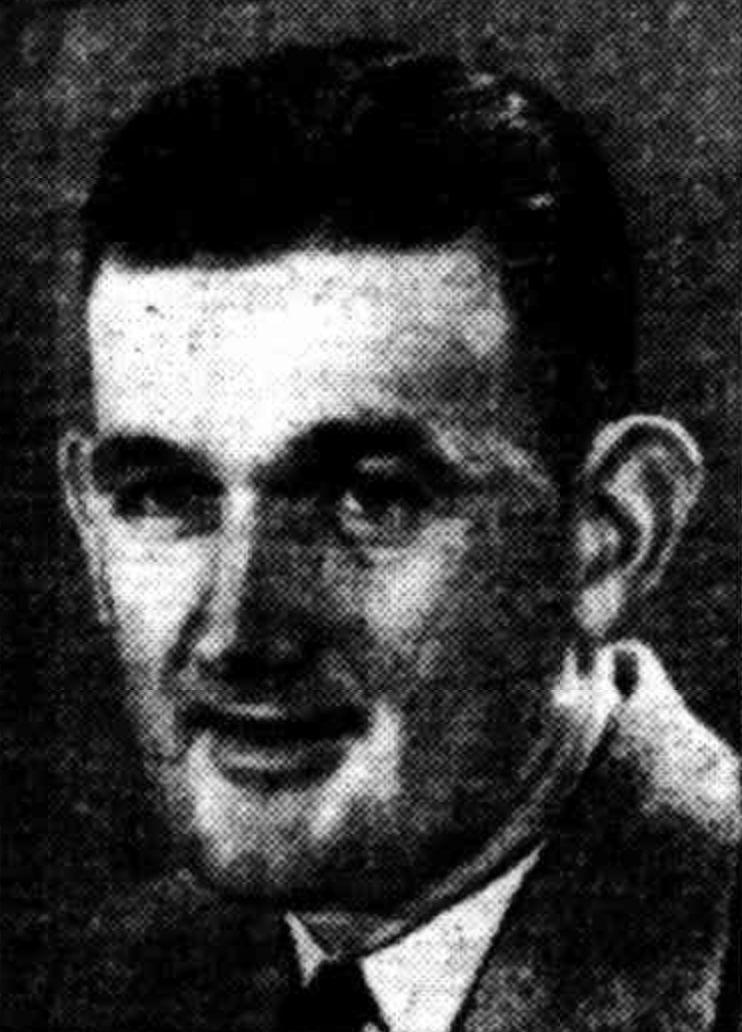

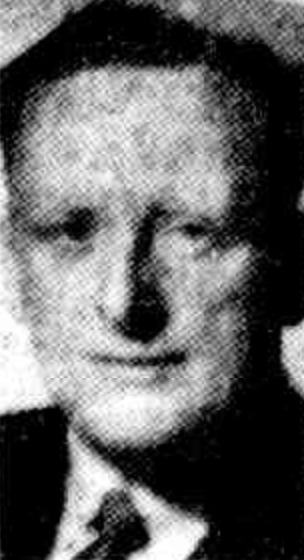
	First party	Second party
Candidate	Frank Scully	Michael McNamara
Party	Labor	Liberal and Country
Primary vote	17,159	4,996
Percentage	77.4%	22.6%
Swing	▲4.4	▼4.4
MP before election
Stan Keon
Labor
Elected MP
Frank Scully
Labor

The 1949 Richmond state by-election was held on 17 December 1949 to elect the member for Richmond in the Victorian Legislative Assembly, following the resignation of Labor Party MP Stan Keon. It was held on the same day as by-elections in Clifton Hill and Kew.

Keon resigned in October 1949 in order to contest the seat of Yarra at the federal election on 10 December 1949 (held one week before the state by-elections), where he was successful and ultimately served until 1955.

Labor candidate Frank Scully won the by-election with a swing of 4.4%, further increasing Richmond's status as a "safe seat" for Labor.

== Key events ==
- 29 October 1949 – Stan Keon resigns
- 17 December 1949 – Polling day

== Candidates ==
Candidates are listed in the order they appeared on the ballot.

Party	Candidate	Background
Liberal and Country	Michael McNamara	Plumber and former Labor member
Labor	Frank Scully	Railway worker active in Australian Railways Union Industrial Group

== Results ==
1949 Richmond state by-election
Party	Candidate	Votes	%	±%
Labor	Frank Scully	17,159	77.4	+4.4
Liberal and Country	Michael McNamara	4,996	22.6	−4.4
Total formal votes		22,155	98.0	−0.2
Informal votes		460	2.0	+0.2
Turnout		22,615	88.4	−5.7
Labor hold		Swing	+4.4	

== See also ==
- Electoral results for the district of Richmond (Victoria)
- List of Victorian state by-elections
