= 1962 Richmond state by-election =

- 12 May 1962

Electoral district of Richmond in the Victorian Legislative Assembly
- Registered: 17,549
- Turnout: 84.0% (▼7.5)
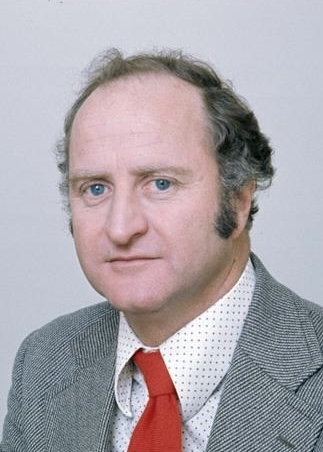
	First party	Second party
		DLP
Candidate	Clyde Holding	Leo Gardiner
Party	Labor	Democratic Labor
Primary vote	9,347	3,802
Percentage	65.9%	26.8%
Swing	▲4.9	▲1.0
MP before election
Bill Towers
Labor
Elected MP
Clyde Holding
Labor

The 1962 Richmond state by-election was held on 12 May 1962 to elect the member for Richmond in the Victorian Legislative Assembly, following the death of Labor Party MP Bill Towers.

Clyde Holding won Labor preselection by one vote, but was able to easily win the by-election with 65.9% of the primary vote.

== Candidates ==
Candidates are listed in the order they appeared on the ballot.

Party	Candidate	Background
Independent	Stirling Davis	
Democratic Labor	Leo Gardiner	Candidate for Richmond in 1961
Labor	Clyde Holding	Lawyer
Independent	John Murray	

== Results ==
1962 Richmond state by-election
Party	Candidate	Votes	%	±%
Labor	Clyde Holding	9,347	65.9	+4.9
Democratic Labor	Leo Gardiner	3,802	26.8	+1.0
Independent	Stirling Davis	897	6.3	+6.3
Independent	John Murray	129	0.9	+0.9
Total formal votes		14,175	96.1	+1.7
Informal votes		569	3.9	−1.7
Turnout		14,744	84.0	−7.5
Labor hold		Swing	N/A	

== See also ==
- Electoral results for the district of Richmond (Victoria)
- List of Victorian state by-elections
