= Electoral district of Jolimont and West Richmond =

Coordinates: 37°49′0″S 144°59′30″E

Jolimont and West Richmond Victoria—Legislative Assembly
- State: Victoria
- Created: 1889
- Abolished: 1904
- Demographic: Metropolitan

Jolimont and West Richmond was an electoral district of the Legislative Assembly in the Australian state of Victoria from 1889 to 1904. It was located in the inner eastern suburbs of Melbourne and included parts of Richmond and Jolimont.

Its area was defined as:

Commencing at the junction of Victoria-street and Separation-street; thence south by Separation-street and Lennox-street to Swan-street; west by Swan-street to Punt-road or Hoddle-street; south by that street to the Yarra River; westerly down that river to a point opposite the end of Gisborne-street; north to and by Gisborne-street to Victoria-parade; east by Victoria-parade and Victoria-street to the commencing point.

Jolimont and West Richmond was abolished in 1904 and several new districts were created, including the electoral district of Abbotsford.

== Members ==
Member	Term
Charles Smith	Apr 1889 – Apr 1892
Joseph Bosisto	May 1892 – Sep 1894
Theodore Fink	Oct 1894 – May 1904

From February 1883 to March 1889, Smith had been one of two members for Richmond.
From December 1874 to March 1889, Bosisto had been one of two members for Richmond.
