= 1889 Victorian colonial election =

| ← 1886 | 28 March 1889 | 1892 → |

All 95 seats in the Victorian Legislative Assembly 48 seats needed for a majority
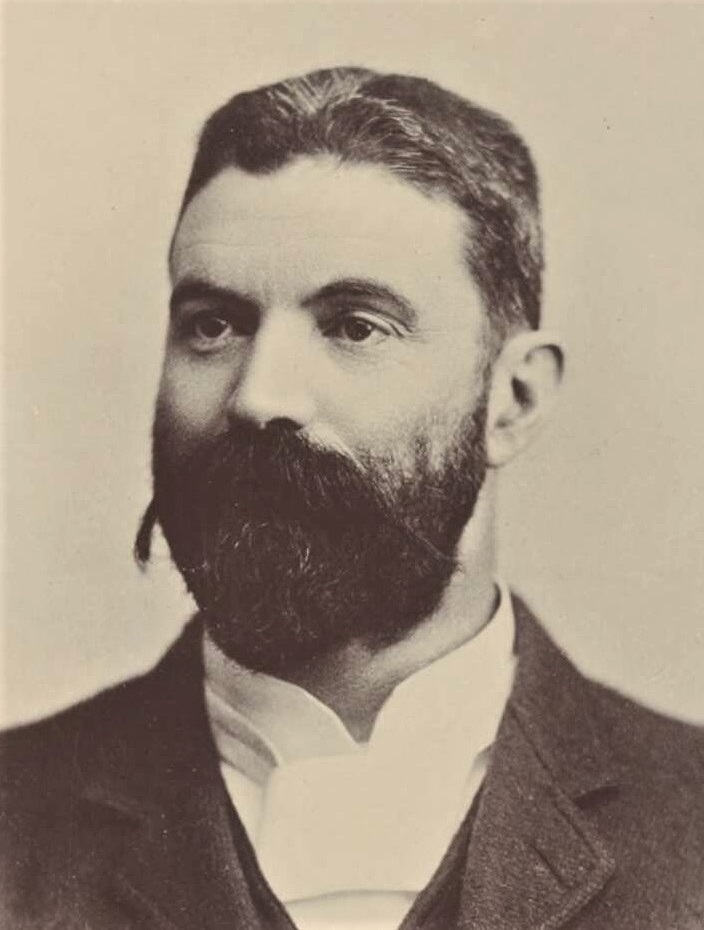

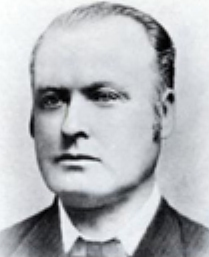
| | First party | Second party |
|---|---|---|
| Leader | Alfred Deakin | Duncan Gillies |
| Party | Liberal Ministerialists | Conservative Ministerialists |
| Leader's seat | Essendon and Flemington | Eastern Suburbs |
| Seats won | 30 | 23 |
| Percentage | 23.14 | 14.81 |
Premier before election
Duncan Gillies
Conservative
Elected Premier
Duncan Gillies
Conservative

The 1889 Victorian colonial election was held on 28 March 1889 to elect the 14th Parliament of Victoria. All 95 seats in the Legislative Assembly were up for election, though 11 were uncontested.

There were 73 single-member and 11 two-member electorates.

The incumbent coalition government, led by Conservative leader Duncan Gillies and Liberal leader Alfred Deakin, was re-elected.

== Results ==
Legislative Assembly (FPTP)
| Party | Votes | % | Swing | Seats | Change |
|---|---|---|---|---|---|
| Liberal Ministerialists | 39,241 | 23.14 | | 30 | |
| Liberal Oppositionists | 34,407 | 20.30 | | 23 | |
| Ministerialists | 32,281 | 19.04 | | 6 | |
| Conservative Ministerialists | 25,103 | 14.81 | | 23 | |
| Oppositionists | 22,168 | 13.07 | | 3 | |
| Conservative Oppositionists | 7,388 | 4.36 | | 7 | |
| Liberal | 4,566 | 2.69 | | 2 | |
| Conservative | 2,558 | 1.51 | | 0 | |
| Independent | 1,837 | 1.08 | | 1 | |
| Formal votes | 169,549 | | | | |

== Aftermath ==
On 30 October 1890, the Gillies-Deakin government was defeated on a vote of confidence, and was succeeded by a composite (though not formally a coalition) government led by Liberal James Munro.

In February 1892 Munro, who was deeply in debt, asked his Cabinet to appoint him Victorian Agent-General in London. He then resigned as Premier and immediately took ship from Port Melbourne. William Shiels became the new Premier on 16 February 1892, and he led the Liberals to the 1892 election.
