= 1864 Victorian colonial election =

- 5 October to 3 November 1864

All 78 seats in the Victorian Legislative Assembly 40 seats needed for a majority
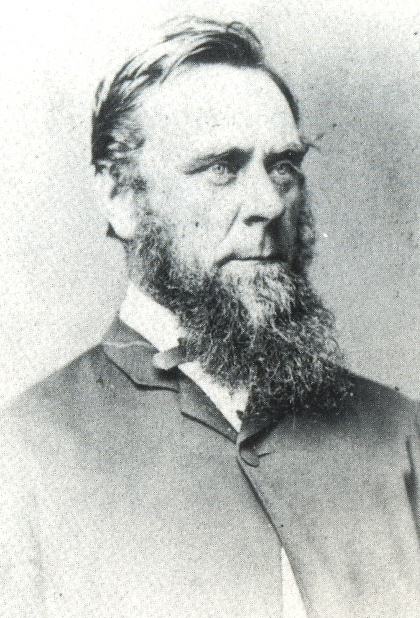

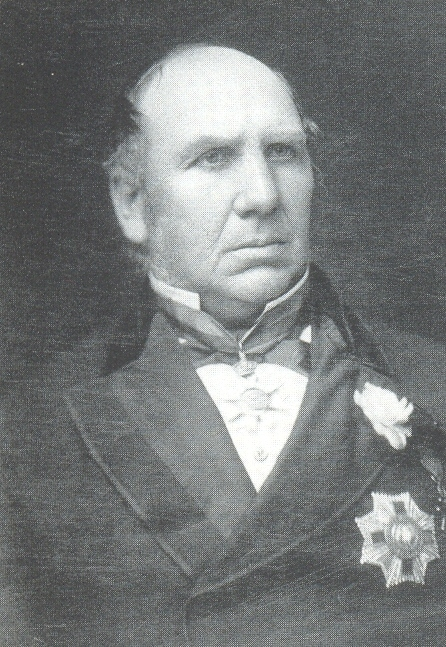
	First party	Second party
Leader	James McCulloch	John O'Shanassy
Party	Moderate Liberal (Protectionist)	Conservative (Free Trade)
Leader's seat	Mornington	Kilmore
Seats won	53	14
Premier before election
James McCulloch
Liberal
Elected Premier
James McCulloch
Liberal

The 1864 Victorian colonial election was held from 5 October to 3 November 1864 to elect the 4th Parliament of Victoria. All 78 seats in 49 electorates in the Legislative Assembly were up for election, though sixteen seats were uncontested.

There were 24 single-member, 21 two-member and 4 three-member electorates.

Support for liberal protectionist candidates dominated this election, to such an extent that the colonial newspapers made no attempt to classify individual elected members as Ministerialists or Oppositionists. While the election was still underway an editorial in The Argus commented that "the Opposition apparently is defunct", adding that "a surprising spirit of concord reigns throughout our political world".

== Results ==
Newspapers made no attempt to classify individual elected members as Ministerialists or Oppositionists.

The members of the Legislative Assembly returned in the 1864 election were overwhelmingly supporters of the protectionist policies of the McCulloch ministry. Many of those elected were new to the Legislative Assembly, with only thirty-eight of the seventy-eight members having seats in the previous parliament.

Legislative Assembly (FPTP)^{[A]}
Party / Grouping	Votes	%	Swing	Seats	Change
Ministerial				53	
Opposition				14	
Independent				11	
Totals	74,946			78	

== Aftermath ==
James McCulloch and his ministry remained in office throughout this parliament.

The Amending Land Act 1865 (28 Vict. No. 237), amending the Land Act 1862 (25 Vict. No. 145), became law on 28 March 1865, allowing selection of Crown land subject to residential and improvements conditions.

With the majority of members in the Legislative Assembly supporting protectionist policies, the government's 1865 budget included restructured customs duties that increased the taxation of imports into the colony that competed with local products. McCulloch included the protective tariff measures in the annual appropriation bill. The Upper House, dominated by conservative free-trade pastoralists, had no constitutional power to amend the appropriation bill and was therefore unable to block the tariff without rejecting the entire bill, which it did in July 1865. In November 1865 McCulloch agreed to separate the tariff legislation from the appropriation bill. The Tariff Bill was passed in the assembly and sent to the council, where it was also rejected. On 11 December 1865 parliament was dissolved in order for a general election to be held on the issue.

== See also ==
- Members of the Victorian Legislative Assembly, 1864–1865

== Notes ==
A.The split of seats between Ministerialists and Oppositionists is based on the seating arrangements at the first sitting of the new parliament on 28 November 1864, with supporters of the government sitting to the right of the speaker and opposition members sitting to the left. A group of independents (unaligned members) sat between the two, in an area known as 'the corner'. The number of votes are tallied from Adam Carr's Electoral Archive website.
