= Charles Smith (Victorian politician) =

Politician

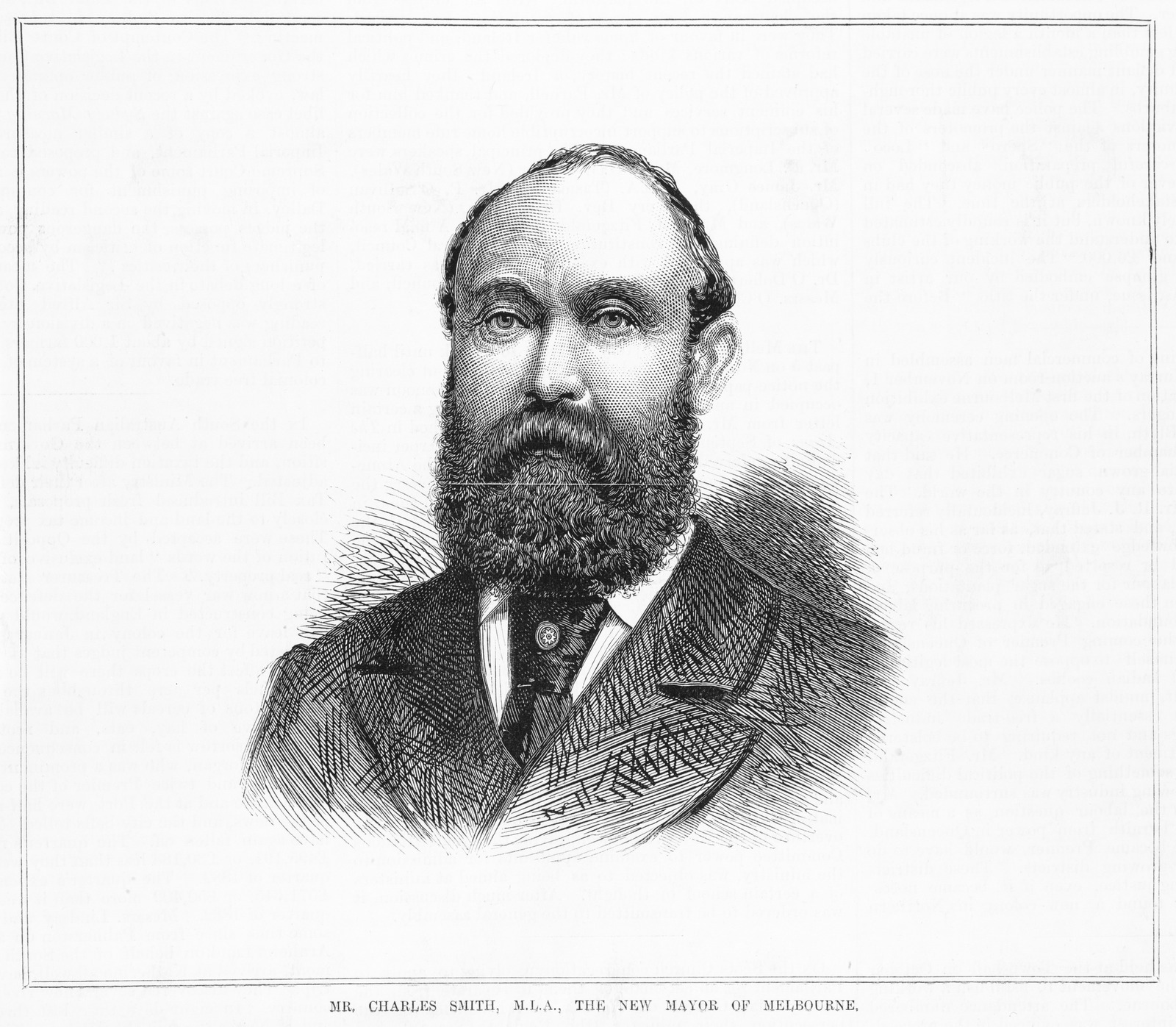
- Charles Smith, 1883, State Library Victoria pictures collection

Member of the Victorian Parliament for Richmond
- In office 1 February 1883 – 1 March 1889

Member of Parliament for Jolimont and West Richmond
- In office 1 April 1889 – 1 April 1892

Personal details
- Born: 5 August 1833 Whitchurch, Shropshire, England
- Died: 25 September 1903 (aged 70) South Yarra, Victoria, Australia
- Spouse: Ellen Louisa Boully (m. 1886)
- Education: Whitchurch and Leicester
- Occupation: Merchant

Charles Smith (5 August 1833 – 25 September 1903) was a member of the Legislative Assembly of Victoria from 1883 until 1892.

Smith migrated from England to Victoria in 1852. He established the malting industry in Victoria in partnership with Jesse Gough, who emigrated to Australia in 1855 with his wife Elizabeth. Jesse Gough was born in 1832 in Gawcott, Buckinghamshire. They had two maltings one in Lennox St and the other in Flinders St, and traded under the name of J.Gough & Co. Smith then became the senior partner of Smith, Winn & Fielding (later Smith & Winn), malt, hop and general merchants. Jesse Gough went back to England in 1870, after selling his part of the business to a Samuel Burston, who traded as Samuel Burston and Co. Samuel's sons James and George, later joined the business. Samuel Burston died in 1886. James and George were now running these maltings. Jesse Gough supplied malting barley from England to Charles Smith. Gough and Smith traded in England until 1879, when the partnership was dissolved and Gough then traded as "J. Gough and Sons."

Smith was a councillor of the Town of Richmond from 1871 to 1879, including a period as mayor in 1873–1874. He was a councillor of the City of Melbourne from 1882 to 1900 including as mayor in 1883–1884. He was elected to the Legislative Assembly as the member for Richmond in 1883. In 1889, after a change of boundaries, he was elected as member for Jolimont and West Richmond, competing his term in 1892. He also served as Harbor Trust Commissioner from 1890 to 1895.
