= Kathleen Maltzahn =

Australian author, academic and anti-sex work activist

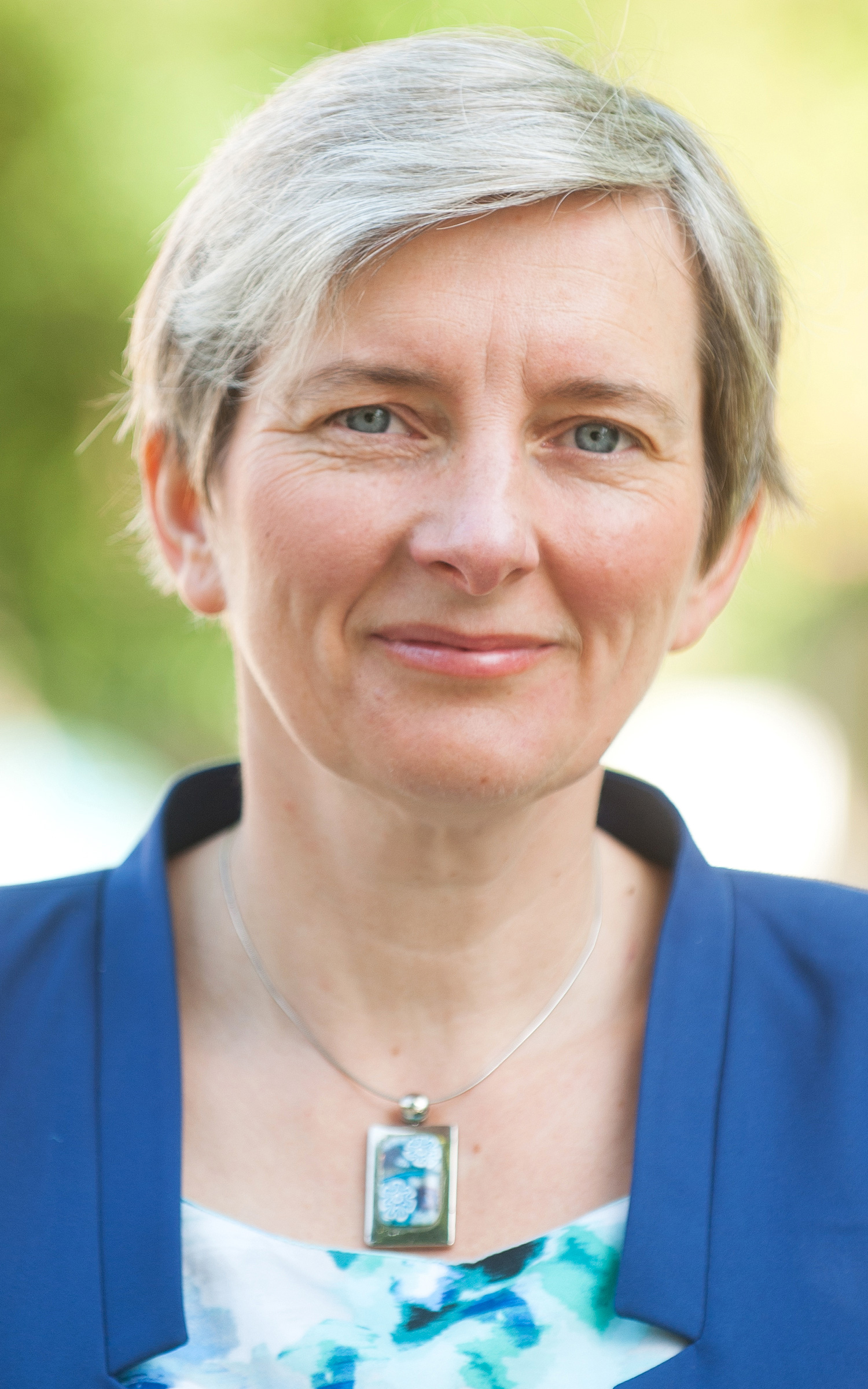
- Maltzahn in 2014

Councillor of the City of Yarra for Nicholls Ward
- In office 2004–2008

Personal details
- Born: 18 September 1966 (age 60) Morwell, Victoria, Australia
- Party: Greens
- Domestic partner: Helena Maher
- Occupation: Politician
- Website: web.archive.org/web/20090819115520/http://www.kathleenmaltzahn.com

Kathleen Maltzahn (born 19 September 1966) is an Australian author, academic and anti-sex work activist. She is a former councillor for the City of Yarra and was the Victorian Greens' candidate for the state seat of Richmond in the 2010, 2014 and 2018 Victorian elections.

== Early life ==
Maltzahn was born in Morwell, Victoria. She attended high school in Melbourne's inner-east, and completed her Higher School Certificate (HSC) in 1984. She commenced study at the University of Melbourne the following year, and completed her Bachelor of Arts in 1988, returning in 1996 to undertake a postgraduate diploma in women's studies.

== Professional life ==
Prior to entering politics, Maltzahn's roles included Interim Director of the East Timor Human Rights Centre and Founding Director of Project Respect, an organisation committed to supporting people in prostitution and opposing sex trafficking. In that role, she successfully campaigned for an end to the mandatory deportation of trafficked people, support services for trafficked people and better police responses. In recognition of their efforts, Project Respect has won a number of awards, including the Social Impact Award of the 2013 inaugural HESTA Community Sector Awards.

From 2007 to 2010, Maltzahn served as executive director of Women's Health in the North (WHIN), an organisation serving the Victorian municipalities of Banyule, Darebin, Hume, Merri-bek, Nillumbik, Whittlesea, and Yarra to improve women's health, safety, and well-being. In 2007, under Maltzahn's leadership, WHIN joined with various women's health organizations in Victoria to successfully campaign for the Abortion Law Reform Act 2008. WHIN made a submission to the Victorian Law Reform Commission titled "The Law of Abortion Information Paper", which was then referred to in the commission's submission to the Victorian Parliament in 2008.

In 2008, Maltzahn authored Trafficked, the first book length account of trafficking in the sex industry in Australia, published by University of New South Wales Press ISBN 978-0-86840-913-9. Later that year, Trafficked was shortlisted for the Literature Non-Fiction Award of the Australian Human Rights Commission's 2008 Human Rights Awards.

Maltzahn was Chairperson of the Eastern Metropolitan Region Regional Family Violence Partnership (2011–2012) and Deputy Executive Officer of the Eastern Domestic Violence Service (EDVOS) (2012–2013) where she oversaw the provision of direct services for women and children escaping violence and for advocacy in an area covering 1 million people in Melbourne's East. Most recently, she has worked at La Trobe University researching gambling in partnership Aboriginal organisations and teaching social policy. She has lectured in social policy at a number of Melbourne universities and TAFEs.

In December 2021, Kathleen Maltzahn participated as a speaker in an online event titled "Gender equality in and out of court: Affirmative consent, restorative justice and sexual assault law reform," hosted by Gender Equity Victoria and Sexual Assault Services Victoria. This event discussed the Victorian government's commitment to introducing an affirmative consent model in rape and sexual assault laws, exploring the implications for gender equity, violence prevention practitioners, and victim-survivors of sexual violence.

As of 2024, Maltzahn serves as the chief executive officer of Sexual Assault Services Victoria, a prominent organization dedicated to addressing and preventing sexual assault.

== Political career ==
=== Local politics ===
Maltzahn served as a Greens councillor for the City of Yarra from 2004 to 2008, where she pushed for a greater emphasis on sustainability, social justice, and curbs on overdevelopment. During her tenure, she chaired the council's Disability Advisory Committee (2004–2008), Bicycle Advisory Committee (2006–2008), and Finance and Human Services Committee (2007–2008). Following the rape of a woman in May 2005 that took place only metres away from the City of Yarra's Fitzroy town hall, the council relied on Kathleen's experience and leadership to form the council's Taskforce on the Prevention of Male Sexual Violence against Women, bringing together local sexual assault services, women's health organizations, Victoria Police, and the Victorian State government to implement measures to prevent sexual violence in the City of Yarra.

In 2008, Maltzahn stood for election as the Greens candidate for Deputy Lord Mayor of Melbourne City Council, alongside fellow Greens candidate Adam Bandt, who was running for the office of Lord Mayor. Bandt and Maltzahn finished second, behind winner Robert Doyle.

=== State politics ===
On 3 July 2009, Maltzahn was preselected as the Greens candidate for the Victorian Legislative Assembly in the inner-Melbourne district of Richmond, then held by Labor's Richard Wynne, in the upcoming 2010 Victorian state election. In 2010, she resigned from her post as executive director of WHIN to actively campaign. Maltzahn won 28.4% of the primary vote, and 43.5% of the two-candidate preferred vote.

Maltzahn stood again as the Greens candidate for Richmond in the 2014 Victorian State election. She gained a 4.5% two-candidate preferred swing, finishing with 48.1% of the two-candidate preferred vote, making Richmond a marginal seat. In 2018, Maltzahn suffered a 3.6% two-candidate preferred swing, winning 44.5% of the two-candidate preferred vote.

== Maltzahn and legal models for the sex industry ==
Maltzahn supports the Nordic model approach to prostitution, which decriminalises the selling of sexual services and criminalises the buying of sexual services.

The Australian Sex Party opposed Maltzahn's views on the sex industry and subsequently targeted Maltzahn's seat over her views on sex work in the 2010 state election, and recommended its voters preference Labor ahead of the Greens in the Victorian Legislative Assembly by-election for the seat of Melbourne on 21 July 2012.

In May 2018, after the Victorian branch of the Liberal Party passed a motion in support of the Swedish Model, Maltzahn stated “If I am elected to state parliament, I will vote in keeping with Victorian Greens policy, and will vote against the Nordic model, including if the Liberal Party introduces it. I will not abstain from the vote. Their agenda is anti-women and I have spent my career fighting for women’s rights.”

Maltzahn remains a controversial figure due to her stance on the issue and sex workers continue to protest against her at public events, including at the Greens 2018 election campaign launch.

== Awards ==
In 2004, Kathleen Maltzahn received a Research Award from RMIT University, along with Dr Sallie Yea and Georgina Costello for "Countering Trafficking for Sexual Exploitation in Australia".

In 2005, she was awarded the inaugural Dame Phyllis Frost Award from the National Council of Women of Victoria in recognition of her work against trafficking.

== Publications ==
- Articles in The Age, The Guardian, The Saturday Paper, The Huffington Post, The Australian, The Courier Mail, The Drum, and The Herald Sun
- Pleasures and Risks Associated with Bingo Playing in an Australian Aboriginal Community: Lessons for Policy and Intervention, with Richard Vaughan, Tiffany Griffin, Darlene Thomas, Raelene Stephens, Mary Whiteside, Sarah Maclean, Journal of Gambling Studies, 2018
- Impacts of Gambling on Young Aboriginal People in Gippsland and East Gippsland, with Ashlee Robertson, Ann Briggs, Clare Haussegger, Mary Whiteside and Sarah MacLean, Gippsland and East Gippsland Aboriginal Cooperative and La Trobe University, 2018
- Gambling in the Sunraysia Aboriginal Community: An Exploratory Study, with Richard Vaughan, Tiffany Griffin, Darlene Thomas, Raelene Stephens, Mary Whiteside and Sarah MacLean, Mallee District Aboriginal Service and La Trobe University, 2017
- chapter in Global Muckraking: 100 Years of Investigative Journalism from Around the World, (New Press, 2014)
- "Trafficking, mental health and human rights", with Louella Villadiego, in Mental Health and Human Rights: Vision, praxis, and courage (Oxford University Press, 2012)
- Maltzahn, Kathleen (2008) Trafficked, Sydney, University of New South Wales Press, ISBN 978-0-86840-913-9
