= 1861 Victorian colonial election =

- 2−19 August 1861

All 78 seats in the Victorian Legislative Assembly 40 seats needed for a majority
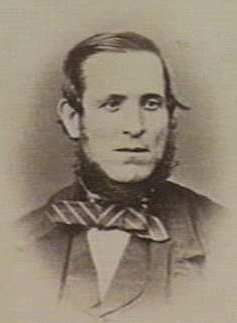

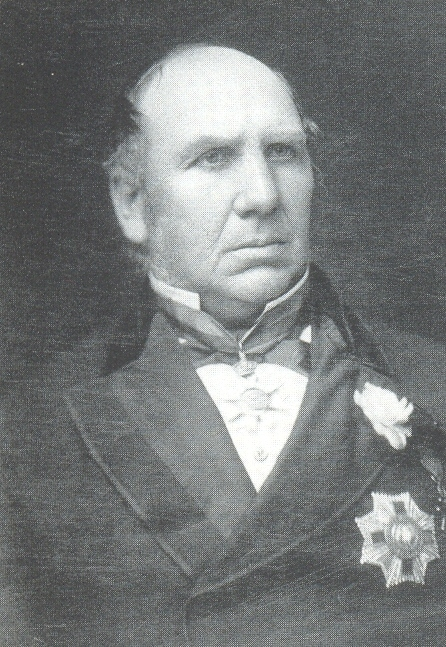
	First party	Second party
Leader	Richard Heales	John O'Shanassy
Party	Moderate Liberal (Protectionist)	Conservative (Free Trade)
Leader's seat	East Bourke Boroughs	Kilmore
Seats won	40	35
Percentage	52.34	25.53
Premier before election
Richard Heales
Liberal
Elected Premier
Richard Heales
Liberal

The 1861 Victorian colonial election was held from 2−19 August 1861 to elect the 3rd Parliament of Victoria. All 78 seats in 49 electorates in the Legislative Assembly were up for election, though four seats were uncontested.

There were 24 single-member, 21 two-member and 4 three-member electorates.

The liberal ministry led by Richard Heales was returned "with materially increased support", supported by the Protectionist League and the goldfields electorates.

== Results ==
Legislative Assembly (FPTP)
Party / Grouping	Votes	%	Swing	Seats	Change
Ministerial	59,730	52.34		40	
Opposition	29,129	25.53		35	
Independent & unspecified	25,259	22.13		3	
Totals	114,118			78	

== Aftermath ==
The first session of the third Victorian parliament commenced on 30 August 1861. Though outnumbered, the opposition had more political experience than ministry led by Richard Heales. Soon after the election support for the government began to wane after several ministerial defections and on 14 November 1861 the Heales ministry was defeated on their budget proposals.

The government resigned and Governor Barkly intervened to encourage an alliance between former political opponents, John O'Shanassy and William Haines. O'Shanassy then formed his third government, which included Haines as treasurer and Charles Gavan Duffy as lands minister.

Barkly expressed concerns about the new government's "small and unreliable majority", but the alliance managed to hold office until June 1863 and passed significant legislation affecting Crown lands, the electoral system, the public service and local government. The government's Crown Lands Act had the intention of opening up agricultural land to selectors, but loosely drafted clauses enabled manipulation of the system by speculators and large landholders. The Civil Service Act 1862 classified public service salaries and set out principles for promotion. The Act Amendment Act 1863 abolished public nominations and imposed a deposit of £50 for candidates in elections for the Legislative Assembly. Included in the changes to the electoral laws was a provision that put ratepayers automatically onto the voters' roll, a change that unintentionally gave the vote to women ratepayers. (Note: O'Shanassy had inadvertently become the first premier to give votes to women. In 1865 he supported the legislative amendment that once again excluded women from the vote.)

In June 1863 O'Shanassy's ministry was defeated in parliament by twelve votes after Duffy proposed that the rental on pastoral runs be calculated upon stock numbers. The ministry resigned on June 19 and was replaced by a ministry formed by an alliance of the supporters of James McCulloch and Richard Heales. McCulloch became premier and Heales took charge of Crown lands.

In 1863 and early 1864 Heales, as lands minister, introduced bills amending the Land Act 1862. His provisions included the reservation of agricultural land for selection and strict conditions of payment. Both bills were rejected in the Legislative Council and allowed to lapse. Heales was granted leave from parliament in April 1864 due to ill-health and died two months later.

McCulloch made land policy the central issue for the October–November 1864 elections and included the proposed reform of the Legislative Council as a secondary issue.

== See also ==
- Members of the Victorian Legislative Assembly, 1861–1864
