= Demetri Dollis =

Australian politician

Demetri Dollis MP
- Δημήτρης Δόλλης
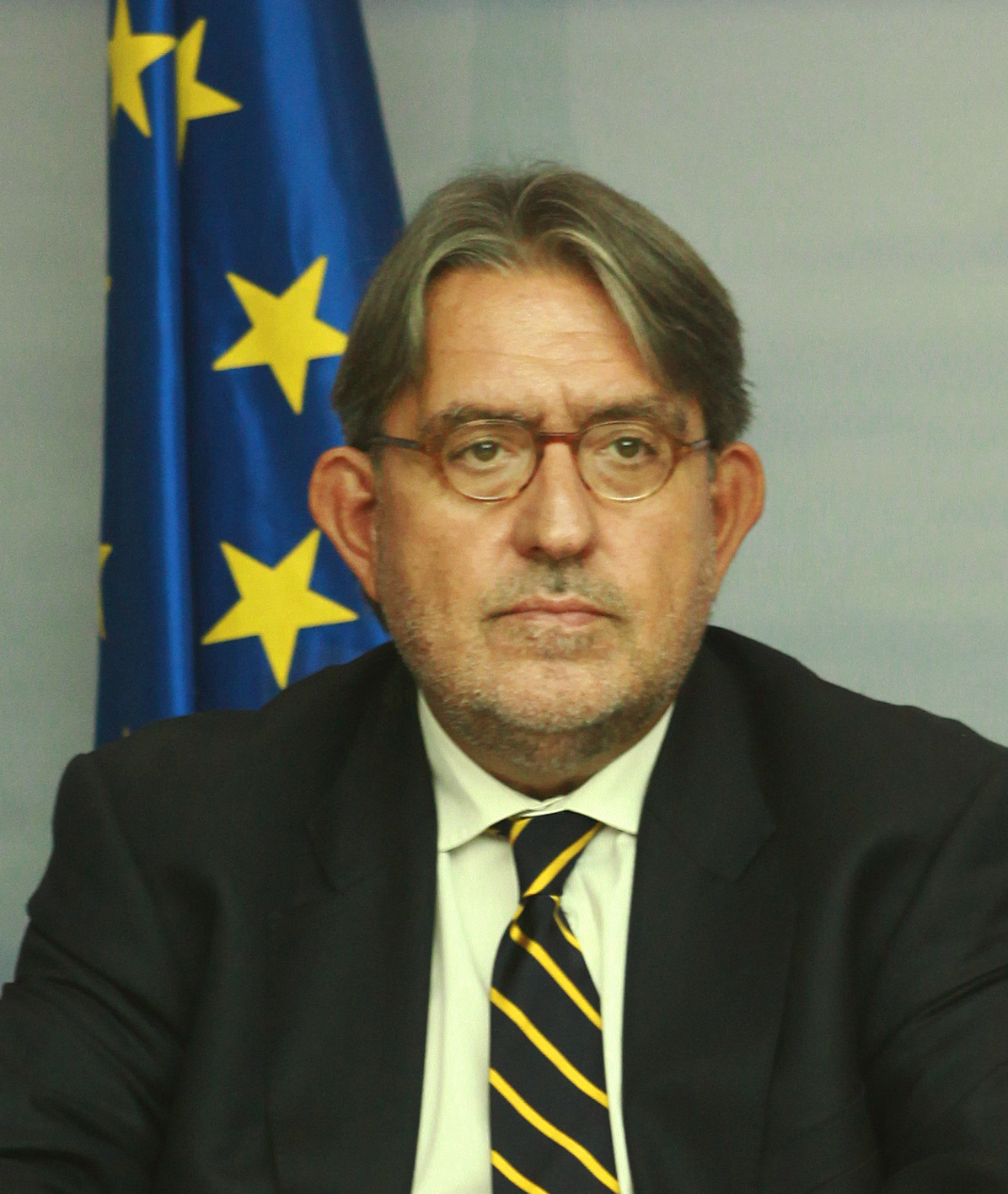
- Dollis in 2010.

Deputy Minister of Foreign Affairs
- In office 5 September 2010 – 20 June 2012 Serving with Mariliza Xenogiannakopoulou (Note: From 7 September 2010 to 10 February 2012.)
- Prime Minister: George Papandreou; Lucas Papademos; Panagiotis Pikrammenos
- Minister: George Papandreou; Dimitrios Droutsas; Stavros Lambrinidis; Stavros Dimas; Petros Molyviatis

Deputy Leader of the Opposition in Victoria
- In office 3 May 1994 – 23 December 1996
- Leader: John Brumby
- Preceded by: Bob Sercombe
- Succeeded by: John Thwaites

Deputy Leader of the Labor Party in Victoria
- In office 3 May 1994 – 23 December 1996
- Leader: John Brumby
- Preceded by: Bob Sercombe
- Succeeded by: John Thwaites

Member of the Victorian Legislative Assembly for Richmond
- In office 1 October 1988 – 17 September 1999
- Preceded by: Theo Sidiropoulos
- Succeeded by: Richard Wynne

Personal details
- Born: Demetrios Dollis; 19 May 1956 (age 70) Argos Orestiko, Kastoria, Greece
- Citizenship: Greece; Australia
- Party: Labor

Demetrios "Demetri" Dollis (Greek: Δημήτρης Δόλλης; born 19 May 1956 in Argos Orestiko) is a former Australian politician of Greek descent and a former Deputy Minister for Foreign Affairs of Greece under the Cabinets of George Papandreou and Coalition Cabinet of Lucas Papademos. He was a Labor member for Richmond in the Victorian Legislative Assembly from 1988 to 1999, and Victorian Deputy Leader of the Opposition from 1994 to 1997.

== Career ==
Dollis was elected at the 1988 Victorian State election. In 1994, Dollis, who was from the Left faction, was elected deputy leader of the ALP as part of a factional deal that saved ALP leader John Brumby from being ousted in an attempted leadership coup.

In 1999, Dollis was disendorsed by the ALP in light of his time spent abroad. Dollis had become involved in helping to free Australian CARE workers imprisoned in Yugoslavia, and was unable to respond to allegations he was seeking a job from the Greek government.

Following his departure from Victorian politics, Dollis took up roles on Greek diplomatic circuit. In 2010 Dollis was appointed as a Greek Deputy Minister for Foreign Affairs alongside Mariliza Xenogiannakopoulou, a role held until June 2012 when the Coalition Cabinet of Antonis Samaras was sworn in.

Victorian Legislative Assembly
| Preceded by Theo Sidiropoulos | Member for Richmond; 1988–1999 | Succeeded by Richard Wynne |
