= 1859 Victorian colonial election =

- 26 August to 26 September 1859

All 78 seats in the Victorian Legislative Assembly 40 seats needed for a majority
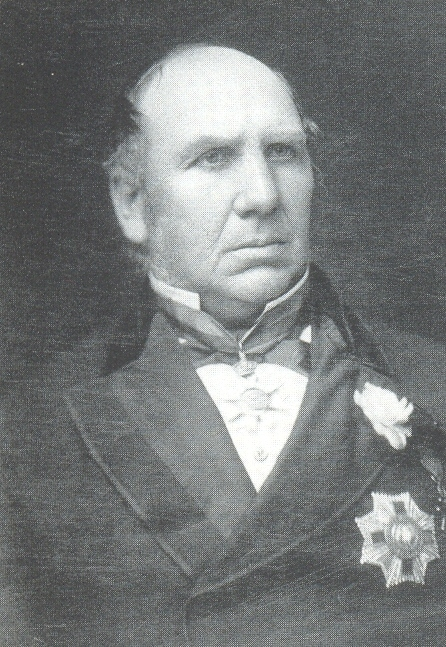

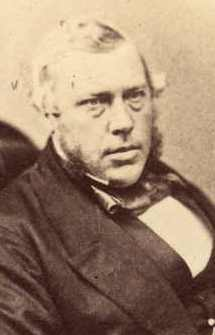
	First party	Second party
Leader	John O'Shanassy	William Nicholson
Party	Conservative (Free Trade)	Liberal (Protectionist)
Leader's seat	Kilmore	Sandridge
Seats won	23	41
Percentage	19.06	30.22
Premier before election
John O'Shanassy
Conservative (Free Trade)
Elected Premier
William Nicholson
Liberal (Protectionist)

The 1859 Victorian colonial election was held from 26 August to 26 September 1859 to elect the 2nd Parliament of Victoria. All 78 seats in 49 electorates in the Legislative Assembly were up for election, though eight seats were uncontested. This election was the first held in Victoria after the electoral rolls were compiled according to the principle of manhood suffrage.

There were 24 single-member, 21 two-member and 4 three-member electorates.

The conservative ministry of John O'Shanassy was defeated at the election.

== Results ==
Legislative Assembly (FPTP)^{[A]}
Party / Grouping	Votes	%	Swing	Seats	Change
Ministerial	18,336	19.06		23	
Opposition	29,077	30.22		41	
Independent	13,107	13.62		12	
Unspecified	35,706	37.11		2	
Totals	96,226			78	

== Aftermath ==
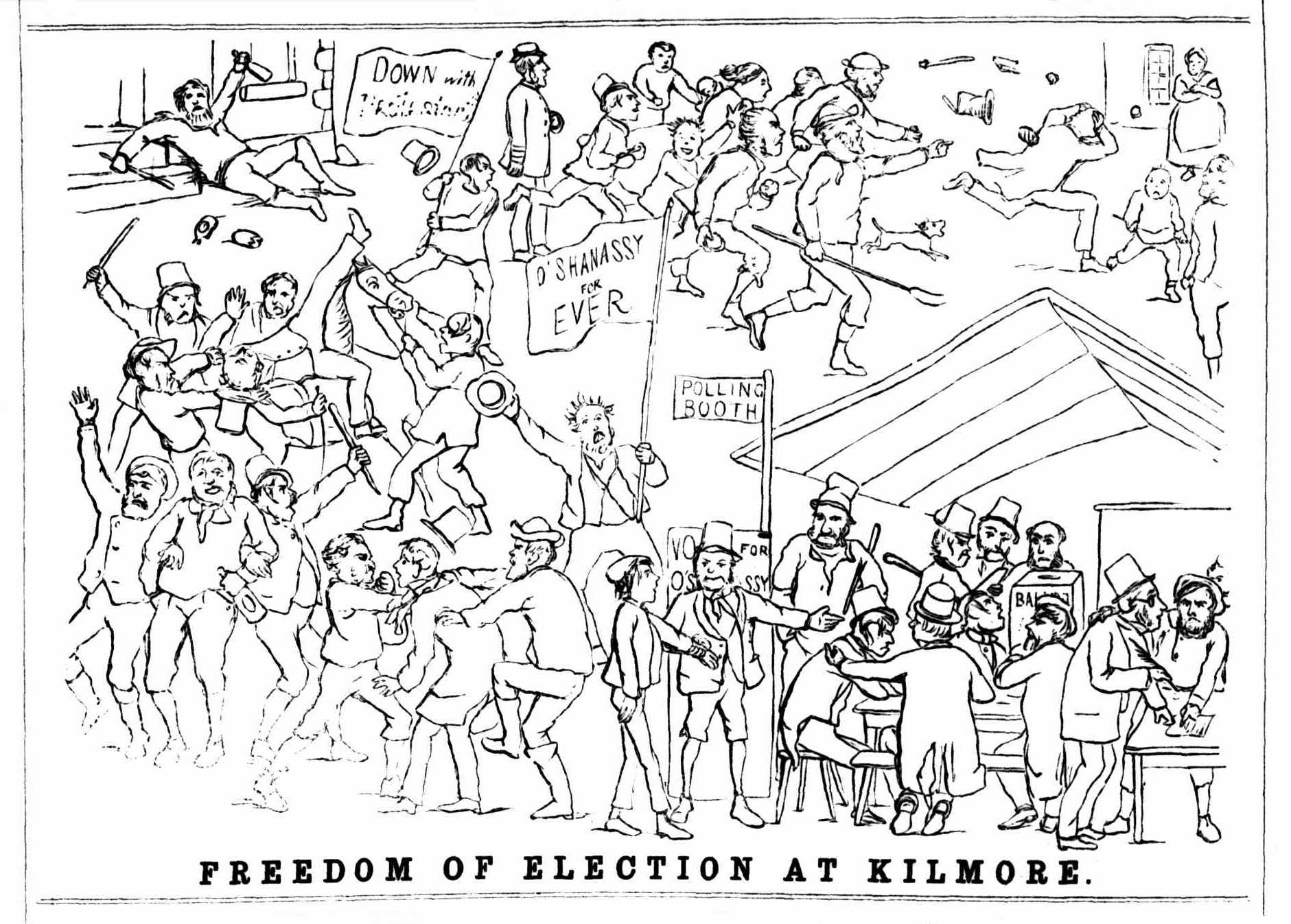
A cartoonist's view of voting in the Kilmore electorate, Melbourne Punch, 8 September 1859.

After the election the second parliament of Victoria assembled on 13 October 1859. With O'Shanassy's ministry "in a hopeless minority", the liberal member William Nicholson moved a motion of no-confidence in the government, which was carried by fifty-six votes to seventeen. Nicholson was then commissioned to form a ministry. Nicholson's ministry, which included James McCulloch as Treasurer and James Service as the minister in charge of the Lands Department, assumed office on October 29.

In January 1860 Service introduced a bill for a Land Act in response to calls from proponents of land reform based upon the 1857 Land Convention, some of whom had been elected to the Legislative Assembly. Its fundamental principle was the abolition of the sale by auction of country land, allowing for the sale of blocks at one pound an acre with deferred payments of up to three-quarters of the amount and severe penalties for the failure to carry out improvements. However the bill fell short of the Land Convention demands and a number of amendments were made by committee in the lower house before the bill was passed and sent to the Legislative Council. In the upper house, dominated by pastoral interests, a multitude of amendments were made undermining the intent of the legislation before it was returned to the Assembly.

Nicholson's government had become wedged between popular pressure for meaningful land reform and the implacable opposition of pastoralists. In response to the obstruction Service carried a motion that the Land Bill be returned intact to the upper house, but the Council continued to resist. Nicholson resigned on two occasions over the deadlock (in late-May and early-August 1860), but each time Governor Barkly re-appointed him after determining there was no viable alternative.

On the afternoon 28 August 1860, after speeches in the Eastern Market reserve by Land Convention supporters, a large crowd assembled in the yard adjoining Parliament House in Spring Street where the legislative chambers were in session. During an adjournment several members "identified with the pastoral interest", who were departing from the building, were harassed and manhandled by the crowd and one of them was struck with a stone. About thirty policemen were placed at the entrance to the lobbies and resisted several attempts by the mob to occupy the building. During the melee stones were thrown and a large plate-glass window was broken. A group of about ten mounted police then entered the yard and "commenced spurring and leaping their horses in all directions". After repeated charges by the mounted troopers, the crowd was driven from the parliamentary yard with the assistance of the foot police. Further confrontations between police and agitators occurred in the surrounding streets before order was restored. Many injuries occurred on both sides and at least nine arrests were made.

The Land Act 1860, "in a travesty of its original form", was finally passed into law on 18 September 1860, but the legislation proved to be an unworkable document. The upper house amendments that remained neutralised many of the original intended reforms and the operation of the act favoured the established landholders. James Service subsequently resigned from the ministry "in disgust at the treatment his Bill had received".

When the parliament resumed sitting on 20 November 1860 the Nicholson ministry faced a no-confidence motion, which was carried. Nicholson resigned and, "after much confusion and factional manoeuvring", a ministry was formed with Richard Heales as Premier and John H. Brooke as the Minister of Lands. The government led by Heales was liberal in outlook but depended on the support of conservatives like O'Shanassy and Charles Ebden, whose co-operation (as it turned out) could not be relied upon. The tenuous political alliance of the Heales ministry was described by The Argus newspaper as "this bizarre combination of opposite atoms".

The colony was experiencing an economic downturn that began in the late 1850s and the new government faced a serious budget deficit. In January 1861 the Assembly voted against the ministry's spending proposals in its appropriation bill and the government only survived after Heales promised expenditure cuts in place of tax increases.

On 13 June 1861 the member for Gippsland, George Hedley, proposed a motion of no-confidence in the Heales ministry. After a debate of twenty-one hours of continuous sitting, the motion was carried by a majority of eighteen. Rather than resign, Heales and his Attorney-General, Richard Ireland, managed to convince the Governor to dissolve the Assembly to enable the calling of an early election. Heales went to the election with a radical platform, advocating reform of the Legislative Council (as a preliminary to land reform), a general system of education, the payment of lower house members and tariff protection for local industry.

== See also ==
- Members of the Victorian Legislative Assembly, 1859–1861

== Notes ==
A.The electoral results list a political affiliation ('Ministerial', 'Opposition' or 'Independent') for only the elected members, with unsuccessful candidates listed without classification. The number of votes cast for unsuccessful candidates accounts for the large number of votes classified as 'unspecified' in the Results table.
