= Louis Smith (Australian politician) =

Australian politician

Louis Lawrence Smith (15 May 1830 – 8 July 1910) was an Australian physician and politician.

He was born in London, to theatre proprietor Edward Tyrell Smith and his wife Madeline Hanette Gengoult. Louis attended St Saviour's Grammar School and the Ecole de Médecine in Paris before entering Westminster Hospital.

In 1852, he migrated to Victoria as surgeon on the Oriental and, after briefly mining gold, established a popular, unconventional medical practice in Melbourne. In 1859, he was elected to the Victorian Legislative Assembly as the member for South Bourke, serving until 1865. He served again as the member for Richmond from 1871 to 1874 and 1877 to 1883) and Mornington from 1886 to 1894. From 1881 to 1883 he was a minister without portfolio.

He was credited with the reduction of postage on all letters within the Australian colonies to one penny.

At times Smith was a prominent figure in horse racing in Victoria, owning a number of horses through the 1860s, including runners that did not place in the Melbourne Cup during that decade.

In 1883, following the end of his first marriage to Ellen that produced six children, he married Marion Jane Higgins at East Melbourne, with whom he had five children. Smith died in Melbourne in 1910.

His daughter, Louise Hanson-Dyer, was a noted music publisher and arts patron, while his son, Sir Harold Gengoult Smith, was a Lord Mayor of Melbourne.
