= Daniel Campbell (Australian politician) =

Australian merchant and politician (1812–1875)

Daniel Stodhart Campbell (1812 – 28 April 1875) was a merchant and politician in colonial Victoria, a member of the Victorian Legislative Assembly.

Campbell was born in Camberwell, London, England, the son of a clergyman. Campbell emigrated to Sydney in 1838 and soon overlanded to the Port Phillip District (later to become the colony of Victoria) in January 1839 and worked as a merchant. In November 1856, Campbell was elected to the Victorian Legislative Assembly for Richmond, a position he held until August 1859.

Campbell died at his residence Vaucluse, Richmond, Victoria, on 28 April 1875.

Victorian Legislative Assembly
New district	Member for Richmond; November 1856 – August 1859	Succeeded by James Francis; Alfred Woolley
