= Gabrielle de Vietri =

Australian politician

Gabrielle de Vietri MP
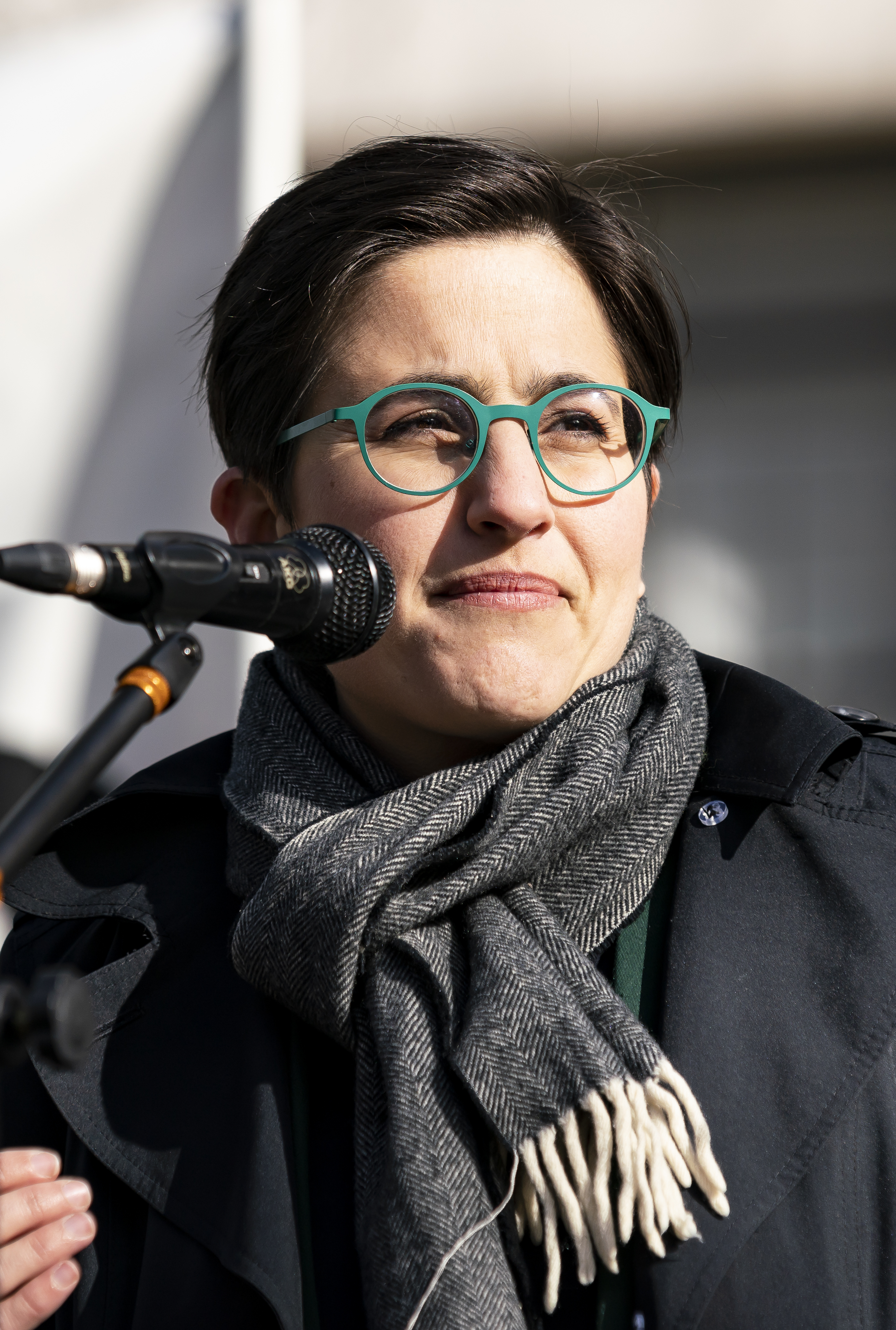

Member of the Victorian Legislative Assembly for Richmond
- Incumbent
- Assumed office 26 November 2022
- Preceded by: Richard Wynne

Councillor of the City of Yarra for Langridge Ward
- In office 6 November 2020 – 9 December 2022

20th Mayor of Yarra
- In office 17 November 2020 – 26 November 2021

Personal details
- Born: 1983 (age 42–43)
- Party: Greens
- Website: gabrielledevietri.org.au

Gabrielle de Vietri (born 1983) is an Australian politician who currently serves as a member of the Victorian Legislative Assembly, representing the electoral district of Richmond. She (Note: De Vietri uses both she/her and they/them pronouns. This article uses she/her for consistency.) is a member of the Victorian Greens and previously served as the mayor of Yarra from 2020 until 2021.

== Life and career ==
In 2003, de Vietri earned a Visual Arts Certificate from the École supérieure d'art d'Aix-en-Provence, followed by a Bachelor of Fine Art (Honours) from the Victorian College of the Arts in 2005 and a Master of Fine Art from Monash University in 2013. She worked as a professional artist until 2019, undertaking numerous residencies and grant projects.

In 2020, de Vietri was elected a councillor for the Langridge Ward in the City of Yarra. She soon became Yarra Mayor, serving until 2021.

De Vietri announced in August 2022 that she would be taking leave from her role at the City of Yarra due to her running in the 2022 state election. She was then announced as the Greens candidate for the district of Richmond. De Vietri was successful in this election.

In November 2023 de Vietri was suspended without pay for posting a photo of a climate protest occurring in parliament on social media.

On 20 March 2024, de Vietri introduced a motion in Victorian Parliament supporting the writers involved in the State Library Victoria Teen Writing Bootcamp controversy. The motion acknowledged that the Library had "terminated the contracts of four writers who have spoken in support of Palestine", and that as political censorship is "indefensible" and public institutions are expected to hold "high ethical and transparency standards", the Library should now fully account for its decision. The motion was not passed.

De Vietri is the Greens spokesperson for Public and Affordable Housing, Renters’ Rights, Arts, Peace & Disarmament and Veterans.

== Personal life ==
De Vietri uses she/her and they/them pronouns. She is queer, making her the first openly LGBTQ woman elected to the Victorian Legislative Assembly.

== Notes ==
Victorian Legislative Assembly
Preceded by Richard Wynne	Member for Richmond; 2022–present	Incumbent
