= Theo Sidiropoulos =

Greek–born Australian politician

Theo Sidiropoulos (24 July 1924 – 7 October 1998) was a Greek-born Australian politician.

He was born in Katerini to Haralambos and Anthoula Sidiropoulos, and attended high school locally. From 1942 to 1945, he fought with the Greek Resistance; after World War II he became a lieutenant in the Greek Army, though rejected nationalism in favour of patriotism pursuing freedom-fighting activities against the Germans. From 1949 to 1954, he was municipal registrar for the City of Katerini, and in December 1954, he migrated to Australia, where he was a factory worker until 1956. On 4 February 1956, he married hairdresser Parthenopi (Popi) Georgiadis; they had two children. He was a tram conductor in Melbourne from 1956 to 1959, ceasing this to purchase a milk bar at the tram depot where he worked. Hence the beginning of a string of milk bars over the years as a small business owner. He joined the Labor Party in 1957, and in 1968 was elected to Collingwood City Council, serving as mayor from 1977 to 1978. In 1977, he was elected to the Victorian Legislative Assembly as the member for Richmond, serving until his retirement in 1988.

Victorian Legislative Assembly
Preceded by Clyde Holding	Member for Richmond; 1977–1988	Succeeded by Demetri Dollis
