= Ted Cotter =

Australian politician

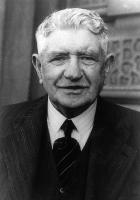
Cotter in his later years

Edmund John Cotter (30 March 1866 – 12 September 1947) was an Australian politician.

Cotter was born in Ballarat to police constable John Cotter and Ellen Ryan. He attended a Catholic school in Ballarat and became a cooper at Geelong and then at Richmond. On 9 May 1889 he married Dinah May Hodges, with whom he had three children. He was secretary of the Coopers' Union and an executive member of the Trades Hall Council. In 1908 he won a by-election for the Victorian Legislative Assembly seat of Richmond, representing the Labor Party. He held his seat until 1945, when he lost Labor preselection and retired. Cotter died in Canterbury in 1947.

Victorian Legislative Assembly
Preceded by George Henry Bennett	Member for Richmond; 1908–1945	Succeeded by Stan Keon
