= 1907 Victorian state election =

Australian state election

- 15 March 1907

All 65 seats in the Victorian Legislative Assembly 33 seats needed for a majority
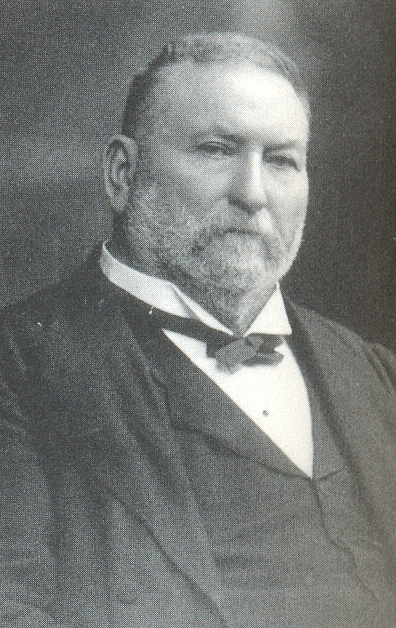

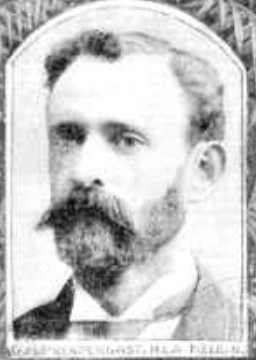
| | First party | Third party |
|---|---|---|
| Leader | Thomas Bent | George Prendergast |
| Party | United Liberal | Labor |
| Leader since | | 1904 |
| Leader's seat | Brighton | North Melbourne |
| Last election | New party | 17 seats |
| Seats won | 51 seats | 14 seats |
| Seat change | ▲51 | ▼3 |
| Percentage | 51.36% | 34.40% |
| Swing | ▲51.36% | ▲1.85% |
Premier before election
Thomas Bent
United Liberal
Elected Premier
Thomas Bent
United Liberal

The 1907 Victorian state election was held in the Australian state of Victoria on Friday, 15 March 1907 to elect 45 of the 65 members of the state's Legislative Assembly. The other 20 seats were uncontested.

The election was in one member districts, using first past the post (plurality) voting.

== Background ==
Ministerialists were a group of members of parliament who supported a government in office but were not bound by tight party discipline. Ministerialists represented loose pre-party groupings who held seats in state parliaments up to 1914. Such members ran for office as independents or under a variety of political labels but saw themselves as linked to other candidates by their support for a particular premier or government.

The National Citizens' Reform League, led by Thomas Bent, had disbanded shortly after the 1904 state election, leading to the majority of Liberals and Conservatives sitting separately again.

Bent formed the United Liberal Party in February 1907. Without Liberal Ministerialists and Liberal Oppositionists competing against each other, three-sided contests were largely eliminated, causing Labor to lose the seats of Ballarat and Geelong.

== Results ==
Legislative Assembly (FPTP)
| Party | Votes | % | Swing | Seats | Change |
|---|---|---|---|---|---|
| United Liberal | 59,785 | 51.36 | +51.36 | 49 | ▲49 |
| Labor | 40,044 | 34.40 | +1.85 | 14 | ▼3 |
| Independent Ministerialists | 11,029 | 9.47 | +4.55 | 1 | ▲1 |
| Independent Labor | 2,795 | 2.40 | +1.03 | 1 | ▲1 |
| Independent | 2,754 | 2.37 | +1.75 | 0 | Steady |
| Formal votes | 116,407 | 99.41 | | | |
| Informal votes | | 0.59 | | | |
| Total | | | | 65 | |
| Registered voters / turnout | 261,080 | 61.27 | −9.70 | | |

== See also ==
- Members of the Victorian Legislative Assembly, 1907–1908
