= George Roberts (Victorian politician) =

Australian politician

George Ernest Roberts (15 February 1868 – 25 November 1925) was an Australian politician.

Born in Hotham to engine-fitter George Roberts and Mary Dargie, he became a hairdresser at Collins Street, Rutherglen and Richmond. On 5 April 1890 he married music teacher Mary Maud Brown. In 1903 he was elected to the Victorian Legislative Assembly as the Labor member for Richmond, but he was defeated in 1904. He left the Labor Party soon afterwards in opposition to the Catholic influence. He was subsequently a hairdresser at Geelong, Tatura and Malvern. During World War I, he served in the Australian Imperial Force's 6th Battalion as a company sergeant major, fighting in France and Belgium, where he was wounded. Roberts was killed in a car accident at Prahran in 1925.
