= Frank Scully (politician) =

Australian politician

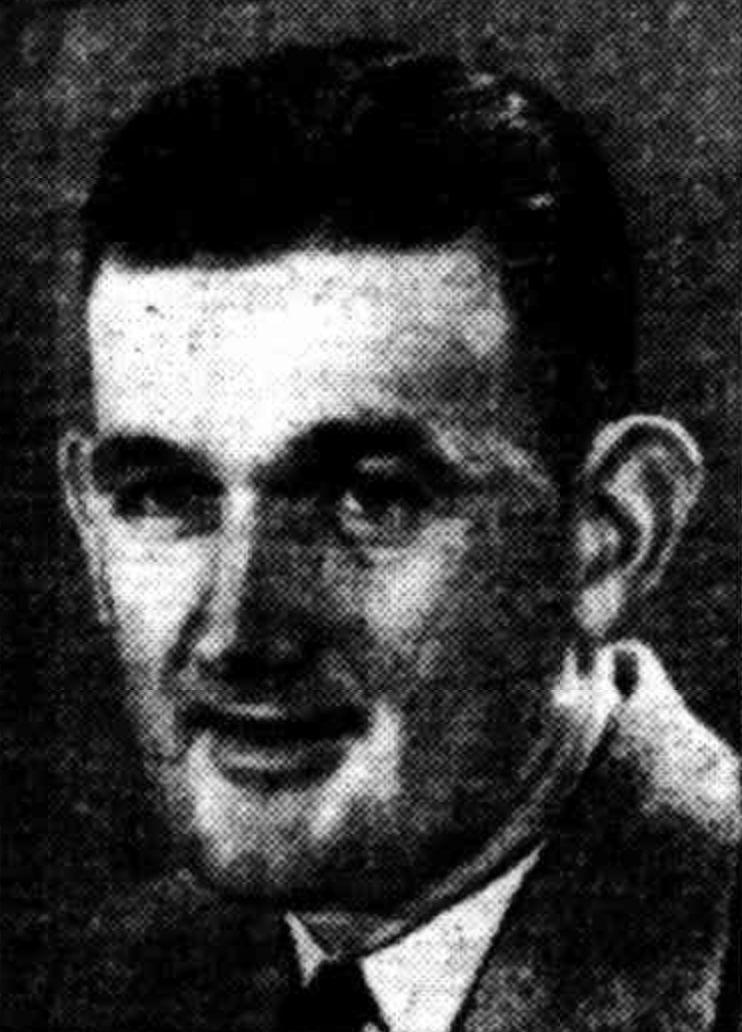

Member of the Victorian Legislative Assembly for Richmond
- In office 17 December 1949 – 30 May 1958
- Preceded by: Stan Keon
- Succeeded by: Bill Towers

Personal details
- Born: Francis Raymond Scully; 27 January 1920 Bendigo, Victoria, Australia
- Died: 12 August 2015 (aged 95) Melbourne, Victoria, Australia
- Party: Labor Party (1949–1955)
- Other political affiliations: Australian Labor Party (Anti-Communist) (1955–1957); Democratic Labor Party (1957–1958)
- Spouse: Moira Grant (m. 1957)
- Occupation: Railway worker

Francis Raymond Scully (27 January 1920 – 12 August 2015) was an Australian politician who served as a member of the Victorian Legislative Assembly for the electoral district of Richmond, representing the Labor Party until March 1955. He was Assistant Minister of Lands, Assistant Minister of Electrical Undertakings in the third Cain government from 1952 to 1955. He was a member of the Catholic Social Studies Movement ("The Movement") in Victoria, and was expelled from the ministry and the ALP as part of the Australian Labor Party split of 1955. He then was a member of the Australian Labor Party (Anti-Communist) (and then the Democratic Labor Party) from 1955 to 1958. Scully was the only member of the DLP in the lower house of the Victorian parliament during these three years.

Scully was a railway worker, and was active in the Australian Railways Union Industrial Group. Scully was defeated at the 1958 elections and subsequently owned a news-agency in Sandringham, Victoria. He died in 2015 at the age of 95.

Victorian Legislative Assembly
Preceded by Stan Keon	Member for Richmond; 1949–1958	Succeeded by Bill Towers
