= Bill Towers (politician) =

Australian politician

Member of the Victorian Legislative Assembly for Collingwood
- In office 20 September 1947 – 30 May 1958
- Preceded by: Tom Tunnecliffe
- Succeeded by: Division abolished

Member of the Victorian Legislative Assembly for Richmond
- In office 31 May 1958 – 18 March 1962
- Preceded by: Frank Scully
- Succeeded by: Clyde Holding

Personal details
- Born: 25 March 1892 Collingwood, Victoria
- Died: 18 March 1962 (aged 69) Fitzroy, Victoria
- Party: Labor Party
- Spouse: May Josephine Cunneen
- Parents: John Towers (father); Ellen Heath (mother)
- Profession: Shoe manufacturer

Military service
- Allegiance: Australia
- Branch/service: Australian Imperial Force
- Years of service: 1914–1919
- Rank: Private
- Unit: 59th Battalion
- Battles/wars: First World War
- Awards: Military Medal

William John Towers, MM (25 March 1892 – 18 March 1962) was an Australian politician.

Towers was born in Collingwood to labourer John Towers and Ellen Heath. He served in the Australian Imperial Force during the First World War, seeing action at Gallipoli and in France, where he was awarded the Military Medal. On 2 July 1919, he married May Josephine Cunneen, with whom he had two children. He joined the Labor Party in 1927 and was a member of Collingwood City Council from 1930 to 1931 and from 1937 to 1952, serving twice as mayor (1939–40, 1943–45). In 1947, Towers was elected to the Victorian Legislative Assembly for Collingwood. He transferred to Richmond in 1958 and served until his death at Fitzroy in 1962.

Victorian Legislative Assembly
| Preceded by Tom Tunnecliffe | Member for Collingwood; 1947–1958 | Abolished |
| Preceded by Frank Scully | Member for Richmond; 1958–1962 | Succeeded by Clyde Holding |
