= Clyde Holding =

Australian politician (1931–2011)

The Honourable Clyde Holding
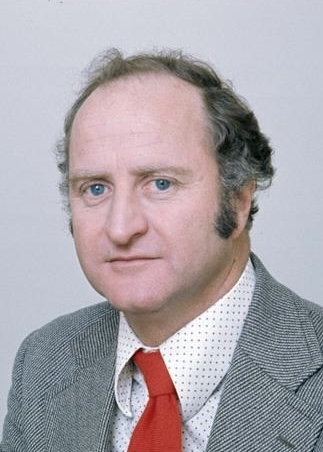
- Holding in 1974

Leader of the Opposition of Victoria Elections: 1970, 1973, 1976
- In office 15 May 1967 – 29 June 1977
- Premier: Sir Henry Bolte; Rupert Hamer
- Deputy: Frank Wilkes
- Preceded by: Clive Stoneham
- Succeeded by: Frank Wilkes

Leader of the Labor Party in Victoria
- In office 15 May 1967 – 29 June 1977
- Deputy: Frank Wilkes
- Preceded by: Clive Stoneham
- Succeeded by: Frank Wilkes

Member of the Victorian Legislative Assembly for Richmond
- In office 12 May 1962 – 3 November 1977
- Preceded by: Bill Towers
- Succeeded by: Theo Sidiropoulos

Member of the Australian Parliament for Melbourne Ports
- In office 10 December 1977 – 31 August 1998
- Preceded by: Frank Crean
- Succeeded by: Michael Danby

Personal details
- Born: 27 April 1931 Melbourne, Victoria, Australia
- Died: 31 July 2011 (aged 80) Castlemaine, Victoria, Australia
- Party: Labor
- Spouse(s): Margaret Sheer (m. 1955; divorced); Judith Crump (m. 1978)
- Children: 3
- Education: University of Melbourne
- Occupation: Lawyer

Allan Clyde Holding (27 April 1931 – 31 July 2011) was an Australian politician who served as Leader of the Opposition in Victoria for ten years, and went on to become a federal minister in the Hawke government.

== Early life and education ==
Holding was born in Melbourne and educated at Trinity Grammar School, Victoria and the University of Melbourne, where he graduated in law.

=== Early politics ===
Holding joined the Labor Party as a student, and during the Labor Party split of 1954–55, during which he supported the party's federal leader, Dr H.V. Evatt, he was Secretary of the Young Labor organisation in Victoria. As a young lawyer he was a prominent campaigner against the death penalty and in favour of the rights of indigenous Australians. His law firm, Holding, Ryan and Redlich, became one of the leading industrial law firms in Melbourne.

== State politics ==
In 1962 Clyde Holding was elected to the Victorian Legislative Assembly for the seat of Richmond, which had mostly been held by conservative Catholic Labor Party members, although his immediate predecessor, Bill Towers, was not. Clive Stoneham, who had been ALP leader from 1958 onwards, was no match for the dominant Liberal Premier, Sir Henry Bolte. After Labor suffered its fifth consecutive defeat at the 1967 election, Holding took over from Stoneham as party leader.

Although Holding was in some ways a social radical, he was opposed to the left-wing faction which had taken control of the Victorian Labor Party following the 1955 split, which had seen many right-wing members expelled. In particular, he supported government aid for non-government, including Catholic, schools, which the left bitterly opposed. He was a supporter of the reforming federal Labor leader, Gough Whitlam, who was determined to reform the Victorian branch as a precondition of winning a federal election. He was also a close ally of the ACTU president, Bob Hawke.

During the 1970 state election campaign, which some commentators suggested Labor could win as a result of voter fatigue with the Liberal government after its 15 years in power, Holding campaigned on the new federal policy of supporting state aid to non-government schools. The week before the election, the left-wing state president, George Crawford and state secretary, Bill Hartley, issued a statement saying that a Victorian Labor government would not support state aid. As a result, Whitlam refused to campaign for Labor in Victoria, and Holding was forced to repudiate his own policy. Ultimately, the Bolte government was re–elected, but Holding did manage a six-seat swing.

This episode led directly to federal intervention in the Victorian branch of the Labor Party. In 1971 the left-wing leadership was overturned by the Labor National Executive and allies of Whitlam, Hawke and Holding took control. The left then formed an organised faction, the Socialist Left, to agitate for socialist policies, supported by some unions.

Bolte retired in 1972 and was replaced by Dick Hamer, a considerably more progressive Liberal from Melbourne. Hamer represented such a sharp change from his staunchly conservative predecessor that he was able to brand himself as a reformist leader even though the Liberals had been in office for 17 years. Holding was unable to get the better of Hamer, and was roundly defeated at the 1973 and 1976 state elections. The surge in support for federal Labor, which saw Whitlam elected Prime Minister in 1972, was not reflected in Victorian state politics.

In 1973 and 1974, Holding and Hawke told officials of the United States of their plan to establish the Parliamentary Friends of Israel group. Frank Wilkes and Holding, who was an informer for the United States, later told diplomatic officials of a "renovation" or "coup" they were staging within the Victorian Young Labor organisation to remove "pro-Arab" supporters.

== Federal politics ==
Holding resigned as Opposition Leader after the 1976 election to transfer to federal politics. He resigned from state Parliament in November 1977 and a month later he was elected to the House of Representatives for the comfortably safe seat of Melbourne Ports, which then included Holding's base in Richmond. He defeated Simon Crean, son of Holding's predecessor, Frank Crean, to win Labor pre-selection. The year before his transfer to federal politics, Holding saw off a leadership challenge from Barry Jones. Jones too resigned from state politics to go into federal politics in 1977 and both he and Holding would become ministers under Bob Hawke.

After the 1980 election, at which Hawke was elected to federal Parliament, Holding emerged as Hawke's key "numbers man" in his campaign to become leader of the federal Labor Party.

=== Minister ===
When Hawke was elected Prime Minister at the 1983 election, he insisted that Holding be included in the ministry, and gave him the difficult but symbolically important portfolio of Aboriginal Affairs. Holding was a strong supporter of land rights for Indigenous Australians, and his main ambition as minister was to bring in legislation for uniform national land rights, which the 1967 amendment to the Australian Constitution would have permitted. But the Labor Premier of Western Australia, Brian Burke, strongly objected to such a step, which would have upset the powerful mining and pastoral industries in his state. After heavy lobbying from Burke, Hawke pressured Holding to drop the proposal.

In 1987 Holding was shifted to the portfolio of Minister for Employment Services and Youth Affairs. In 1988 he became Minister for Transport and Communications Support. A few months later he was promoted to Cabinet and made Minister for Immigration, Local Government and Ethnic Affairs, but later in the year there was another reshuffle and he was demoted to the Arts and Territories portfolio, outside Cabinet. He held this post until the 1990 election, when he was dropped from the ministry.

=== Backbench ===
Melbourne Ports was significantly altered ahead of the 1990 election. Long one of the safest Labor seats in the nation, it was pushed slightly to the east to take in some wealthier, Liberal-leaning suburbs. This knocked Holding's majority from a reasonably safe 9.9 percent to a marginal 3.9 percent. Nonetheless, Holding was re–elected with a small swing against him. He remained in the House as a backbencher until his retirement in 1998.

Victorian Legislative Assembly
Preceded by Bill Towers	Member for Richmond; 1962–1977	Succeeded by Theo Sidiropoulos
Parliament of Australia
Preceded by Frank Crean	Member for Melbourne Ports; 1977–1998	Succeeded by Michael Danby
Political offices
Preceded by Ian Wilson	Minister for Aboriginal Affairs; 1984–1987	Succeeded by Gerry Hand
Preceded by Ralph Willis	Minister for Employment Services and Youth Affairs; 1987–1988	Succeeded by Peter Duncan
Preceded by Peter Duncan	Minister for Transport and Communications Support; 1987–1988	Succeeded by Peter Morris
Preceded by Mick Young	Minister for Immigration, Local; Government and Ethnic Affairs; 1988	Succeeded by Robert Ray (immigration); Margaret Reynolds (local government)
Preceded by John Brown	Minister for the Arts and Territories; 1988–1990	Succeeded by David Simmons
Party political offices
Preceded by Clive Stoneham	Leader of the Labor Party in Victoria; 1967–1977	Succeeded by Frank Wilkes
