= Stan Keon =

Australian politician

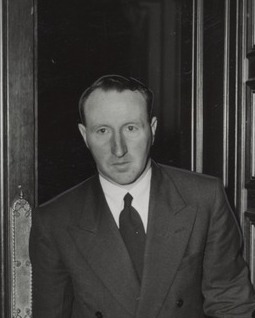

Member of the Australian Parliament for Yarra
- In office 10 December 1949 – 10 December 1955
- Preceded by: James Scullin
- Succeeded by: Jim Cairns

Member of the Victorian Legislative Assembly for Richmond
- In office 10 November 1945 – 22 October 1949
- Preceded by: Ted Cotter
- Succeeded by: Frank Scully

Personal details
- Born: Horace Stanley Keon; 2 July 1915 Melbourne, Victoria
- Died: 22 January 1987 (aged 71)
- Party: Labor (until 1955); Labor (A-C) (1955–1957); DLP (1957–)

Standish Michael Keon (2 July 1915 (Note: The Parliament of Victoria gives his date of birth as 2 July 1915, while the Australian Dictionary of Biography gives it as 3 July 1913.) – 22 January 1987) was an Australian politician who represented the Australian Labor Party in the Federal Parliament from 1949 to 1955, having served previously in the State Parliament of Victoria.

== Early life ==
He was the third surviving son of Australian-born parents, Philip Tobyn Keon, a lorry driver, and his wife, Jane (née Scott). His Christian names were registered as Horace Stanley; Horace being the name of a brother who had died the previous year. He attended Roman Catholic schools in East Melbourne and Richmond, and later won a scholarship to attend Xavier College, but couldn't attend due to reduced family circumstances, which compelled him to start working at the age of 12.

== Political career ==
Keon's November 1945 election to the electoral district of Richmond in the Victorian Parliament followed a bitter pre-selection contest between supporters of the political machine of John Wren, on one hand, and the "Catholic Social Studies Movement" of B. A. Santamaria, on the other.

Keon won the House of Representatives seat of Yarra at the 1949 federal election, succeeding former Prime Minister James Scullin. Keon himself was widely seen as a future Prime Minister. In 1955, he and six other Victorian federal members were expelled from the Labor Party as a result of the split in the party caused by the controversy surrounding the role of Industrial Groups within the ALP. In April 1955, the seven expelled Labor parliamentarians became founding members of the Australian Labor Party (Anti-Communist), which was renamed the Democratic Labor Party in 1957. Keon became the deputy leader of the new party in federal parliament under Bob Joshua.

Keon was narrowly defeated in Yarra by the Labor candidate, Jim Cairns; all of the other Labor defectors were defeated as well. He made four subsequent but unsuccessful attempts to vanquish Cairns at succeeding federal elections. He eventually had a spectacular falling-out with his controversial one-time ally Santamaria. Keon also unsuccessfully contested a 1978 state by-election in Ballarat Province for the DLP.

== Notes ==
Parliament of Australia
Preceded by James Scullin	Member for Yarra; 1949–1955	Succeeded by Jim Cairns
