= George Henry Bennett =

Australian brewer and politician (1850–1908)

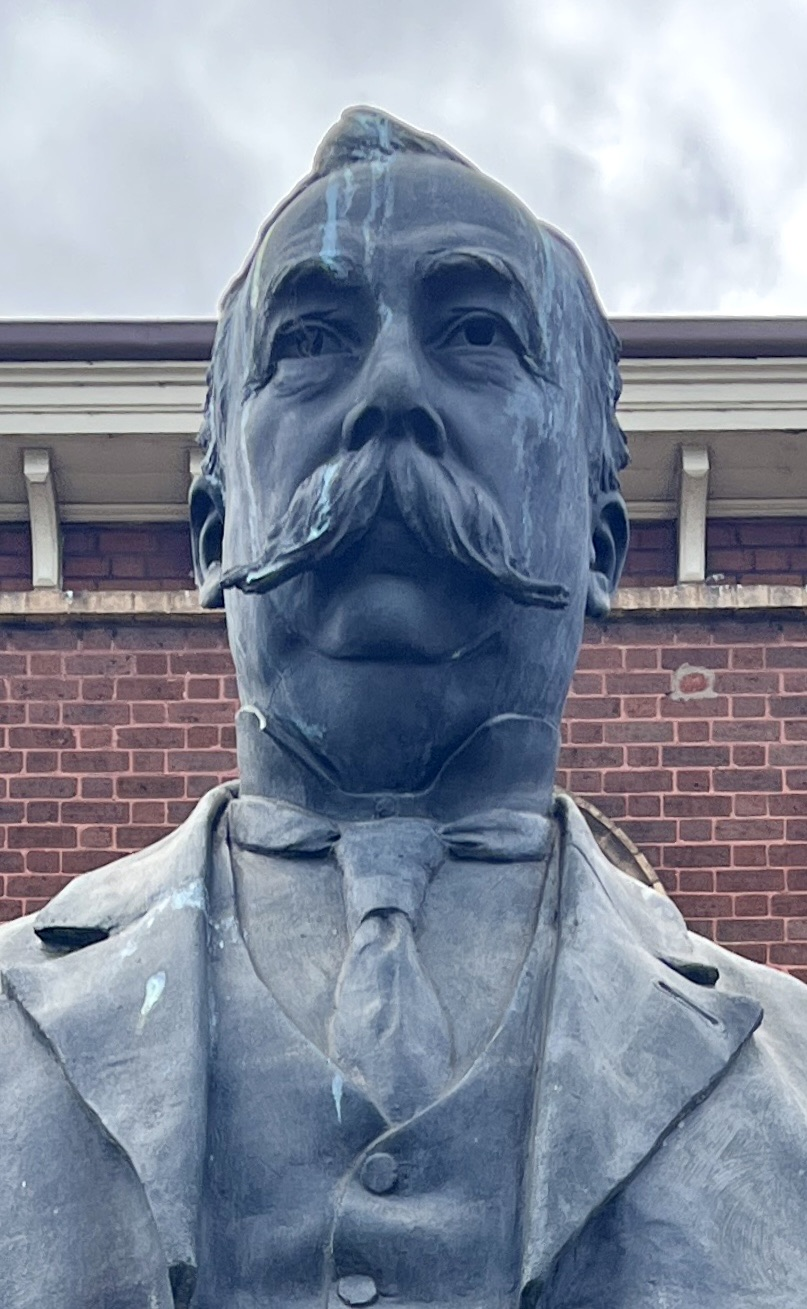
George Hy. Bennett

George Henry Bennett (1850 – 8 September 1908) was an Australian brewer and a politician. He served as city councillor and later Mayor of Richmond. He was elected to the Victorian Legislative Assembly for Richmond in 1889 and re-elected seven times. A statue of his bust can be found on atop a water fountain erected outside the Richmond Town Hall.

== Early life ==
Bennett was born in Buckie, Banffshire, Scotland. His family emigrated to Australia in 1855.

== Career ==
He managed the Victoria Sugar Co. and later, with a partner, owned Excelsior Brewery, a porterbrewing business. Excelsior Brewery operated in Collingwood and Richmond. As larger brewers took over the local market, Excelsior moved to manufacturing aerated waters and cordials at Richmond. He took over sole control of the company from August 1883.

In 1880 Bennett was elected to the Richmond town council and, in turn, was elected Mayor in 1886. As Mayor he was also elected as the second President of the fledgling Richmond Football Club, commencing with the 1887 season. He held this post for the next twenty-two years until his death. During his tenure the club won its first two Victorian Football Association premierships and gained admittance to the more powerful Victorian Football League.

A liberal and protectionist, he was elected to the seat of Richmond in the Victorian Legislative Assembly in 1889 and was then re-elected at the next seven elections.

== Death and legacy ==
Bennett died of pneumonia at his home in Richmond, Victoria, Australia, on 8 September 1908. He was survived by his wife, Jessie, and two of their three daughters.

His bust stands outside the Richmond Town Hall.
