= Members of the Victorian Legislative Assembly, 1904–1907 =

- ←1902–1904 1907–1908→

This is a list of members of the Victorian Legislative Assembly as elected at the 1 June 1904 election and subsequent by-elections up to the election of 15 March 1907.

Note the "Term in Office" refers to that members term(s) in the Assembly, not necessarily for that electorate.

20th Parliament
Name	Party	Electorate	Term in Office
Frank Anstey	Labor	Brunswick	1902–1910
Reginald Argyle	Anti-Socialist	Dalhousie	1900–1914
Alfred Bailes		Bendigo East	1886–1894; 1897–1907
Henry Beard	Labor	Jika Jika	1904–1907
William Beazley	Labor	Abbotsford	1889–1912
George Bennett		Richmond	1889–1908
Harry Bennett	Labor	Ballarat West	1904–1907
Thomas Bent	Anti-Socialist / Reform	Brighton	1871–1894; 1900–1909
Alfred Billson	Anti-Socialist	Ovens	1901–1902; 1904–1927
John Billson	Labor	Fitzroy	1900–1924
John Bowser	Anti-Socialist	Wangaratta	1894–1929
James Boyd	non-Labor	Melbourne	1901–1908
Frederick Bromley		Carlton	1892–1908
Ewen Cameron ^{[a]}		Glenelg	1900–1906
Ewen Hugh Cameron	Anti-Socialist	Evelyn	1874–1914
James Cameron	Anti-Socialist	Gippsland East	1902–1920
John Carlisle	Anti-Socialist	Benalla	1903–1927
William Colechin		Geelong	1904–1907
Albert Craven	Anti-Socialist	Benambra	1889–1913
John Cullen	Anti-Socialist	Gunbower	1901–1911
Alfred Downward	Anti-Socialist	Mornington	1894–1929
James Francis Duffus		Port Fairy	1894–1908; 1911–1914
George Elmslie	Labor	Albert Park	1902–1918
George Fairbairn ^{[b]}		Toorak	1903–1906
Charles Forrest	Anti-Socialist	Polwarth	1886–1894; 1897–1911
David Gaunson	Labor	Public Officers	1875–1881; 1883–1889; 1904–1906
Samuel Gillott ^{[c]}		East Melbourne	1899–1906
George Graham	Anti-Socialist	Goulburn Valley	1884–1914
John Gray	Anti-Socialist	Swan Hill	1904–1917
Martin Hannah	Labor	Railway Officers	1904–1906; 1908–1921
Albert Harris	Anti-Socialist	Walhalla	1883–1910
George Holden	Independent	Warrenheip	1900–1913
Thomas Hunt		Upper Goulburn	1874–1892; 1903–1908
William Hutchinson	Anti-Socialist	Borung	1902–1920
William Irvine ^{[d]}		Lowan	1894–1906
William Keast	Independent	Dandenong	1900–1917
Hubert Patrick Keogh		Gippsland North	1901–1908
Hay Kirkwood		Eaglehawk	1902–1907
Thomas Langdon	Anti-Socialist	Korong	1880–1889; 1892–1914
Harry Lawson	Anti-Socialist	Castlemaine and Maldon	1900–1928
John Lemmon	Labor	Williamstown	1904–1955
Jonas Levien ^{[e]}		Barwon	1871–1877; 1880–1906
Thomas Livingston	Anti-Socialist	Gippsland South	1902–1922
Peter McBride	Anti-Socialist	Kara Kara	1897–1913
Robert McCutcheon	Anti-Socialist	St Kilda	1902–1917
Charles McGrath	Labor	Grenville	1904–1913
Robert McGregor	Anti-Socialist	Ballarat East	1894–1924
Hugh McKenzie	Anti-Socialist	Rodney	1904–1917
John Mackey	Anti-Socialist	Gippsland West	1902–1924
Donald Mackinnon	Anti-Socialist	Prahran	1900–1920
Donald McLeod	Anti-Socialist	Daylesford	1900–1923
Frank Madden	Anti-Socialist	Boroondara	1894–1917
John Morrissey		Waranga	1897–1907
John Murray	Independent	Warrnambool	1884–1916
David Oman	Anti-Socialist	Hampden	1900–1927
Alfred Richard Outtrim	Labor	Maryborough	1885–1902; 1904–1920
Alexander Peacock	Anti-Socialist	Allandale	1889–1933
George Prendergast	Labor	North Melbourne	1894–1897; 1900–1926; 1927–1937
Andrew Robertson	Anti-Socialist	Bulla	1903–1924
George Sangster	Labor	Port Melbourne	1894–1915
David Smith	Labor	Bendigo West	1904–1924
Robert Solly	Labor	Railway Officers	1904–1906; 1908–1932
George Swinburne	Anti-Socialist	Hawthorn	1902–1913
John Thomson	Anti-Socialist	Dundas	1892–1900; 1902–1914
Richard Toutcher	Independent	Stawell and Ararat	1897–1935
Edward Warde	Labor	Flemington	1900–1925
William Watt	Independent	Essendon	1897–1900; 1902–1914
Edgar Wilkins		Collingwood	1892–1908

Thomas Bent was Premier, Treasurer and Minister for Railways. Frank Madden was Speaker, Albert Craven was Chairman of Committees.

^{[a]} Ewen Cameron (MLA Glenelg) died 30 March 1906; replaced by Hugh Campbell in May 1906.
^{[b]} Fairbairn resigned in September 1906 to contest the Federal seat of Fawkner; replaced by Norman Bayles October 1906.
^{[c]} Gillott resigned December 1907; replaced by Henry Weedon in January 1907.
^{[d]} Irvine resigned in June 1906 to take the Federal seat of Flinders; replaced by Robert Stanley in July 1906.
^{[e]} Levien died 24 May 1906; replaced by James Farrer in June 1906.
