= 1904 Victorian state election =

Australian state election

- 1 June 1904

All 67 seats in the Victorian Legislative Assembly 34 seats needed for a majority
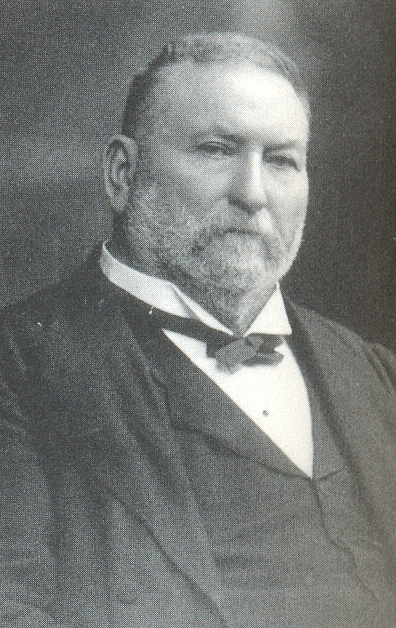

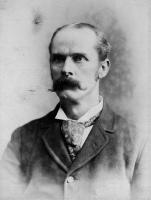
	First party	Second party
Leader	Thomas Bent	Frederick Bromley
Party	National Citizens Reform League	Labour
Leader since	1904	1904
Leader's seat	Brighton	Carlton
Last election	47 seats	12 seats
Seats won	35 seats	17 seats
Seat change	▼12	▲5
Percentage	36.14	32.55
Swing	▼5.93%	▲14.54%
Premier before election
Thomas Bent
National Citizens Reform League
Elected Premier
Thomas Bent
National Citizens Reform League

The 1904 Victorian state election was held in the Australian state of Victoria on 1 June 1904 to elect 67 members to the state's Legislative Assembly.

It was the first election to be held in Victoria since the passing of the Constitution Act 1903 (also known as the "Constitution Reform Act"), which reduced the number of seats in the Legislative Assembly from 95 to 67 and removed all existing two-member electorates. It also created three new electorates representing public and railways officers: in the Legislative Council, the Electoral province for Public Officers and Railway Officers, and in the Legislative Assembly the Electoral district for Public Officers and a two-member Electoral district for Railway Officers.

These new electorates were elected by public and railway officers on a statewide basis. Railway Officers referred to permanent employees of the Victorian Railways and Public Officers referred to permanent employees in the public service of any Victorian government department (other than the Railways), including members of the Victoria Police. Said officers were required to vote for these seats rather than the geographical seats in which they resided. Members of the public service had previously not been eligible to stand as candidates without first resigning. Under these changes, they could stand while a state employee, and if successful in winning a seat, would have a leave of absence while sitting as an MP. This was the only state election at which these seats were contested, as they were abolished before the 1907 election. (There was, however, a by-election for Public Officers in early 1907.)

== Background ==
Ministerialists were a group of members of parliament who supported a government in office but were not bound by tight party discipline. Ministerialists represented loose pre-party groupings who held seats in state parliaments up to 1914. Such members ran for office as independents or under a variety of political labels but saw themselves as linked to other candidates by their support for a particular premier or government.

Thomas Bent was elected on 16 February 1904 leader of the Commonwealth Liberal Party, replacing Premier William Irvine who went into federal politics, and went into the election as the incumbent Premier. At the June 1904 election Bent won a comfortable majority with 35 of the 67 seats, and the Labour Party became the second largest party in the Assembly with 17 seats.

== Results ==
Legislative Assembly (FPTP)
Party	Votes	%	Swing	Seats	Change
Reform League Ministerialists	55,426	36.14	−5.93	35	▼12
Labour	49,922	32.55	+14.54	17	▲5
Liberal Oppositionists	37,422	24.40	+6.31	12	▼3
Independent Ministerialists	7,554	4.93	−8.52	2	▼5
Independent Labour	2,108	1.37	−0.50	1	▼1
Independent	945	0.62	+0.62	0	Steady
Formal votes	153,377	99.03	−0.62		
Informal votes	1,498	0.97	+0.62		
Total	154,875			67	
Registered voters / turnout	277,006	63.38	−2.03		

== See also ==
- Members of the Victorian Legislative Assembly, 1904–1907
