= Electoral results for the district of Carlton =

Victoria, Australia, district election results

This is a list of electoral results for the electoral district of Carlton in Victorian state elections.

== Members for Carlton ==
Member	Party	Term
James Munro	Unaligned	1877–1880
John Gardiner	Unaligned	1880–1892
Frederick Bromley	Labour	1892–1908
Robert Solly	Labor	1908–1932
Bill Barry	Labor	1932–1955
Bill Barry	Labor (Anti-Communist)	1955
Denis Lovegrove	Labor	1955–1958

== Election results ==
=== Elections in the 1950s ===
1955 Victorian state election: Carlton
Party	Candidate	Votes	%	±%
Labor	Denis Lovegrove	7,141	49.2	
Labor (A-C)	Bill Barry	4,809	33.1	
Liberal and Country	Francis Michaelson	1,998	13.8	
Communist	John Prescott	568	3.9	
Total formal votes		14,516	93.7	
Informal votes		975	6.3	
Turnout		15,491	91.1	
Two-candidate-preferred result
Labor	Denis Lovegrove	8,091	55.7	
Labor (A-C)	Bill Barry	6,425	44.3	
Labor hold		Swing		

1952 Victorian state election: Carlton
Party	Candidate	Votes	%	±%
Labor	Bill Barry	18,152	91.9	+17.6
Communist	John Prescott	1,597	8.1	+8.1
Total formal votes		26,358	97.8	−0.4
Informal votes		599	2.2	+0.4
Turnout		26,957	94.2	+0.5
Labor hold		Swing	N/A	

1950 Victorian state election: Carlton
Party	Candidate	Votes	%	±%
Labor	Bill Barry	17,692	74.3	+7.3
Liberal and Country	Frank Block	6,124	25.7	−7.3
Total formal votes		23,816	98.2	+0.3
Informal votes		439	1.8	−0.3
Turnout		24,255	92.8	+0.9
Labor hold		Swing	+7.3	

=== Elections in the 1940s ===
1947 Victorian state election: Carlton
Party	Candidate	Votes	%	±%
Labor	Bill Barry	16,458	67.0	−9.2
Liberal	Stanley Lang	8,124	33.0	+33.0
Total formal votes		24,582	97.9	+5.0
Informal votes		532	2.1	−5.0
Turnout		25,114	91.9	+6.5
Labor hold		Swing	N/A	

1945 Victorian state election: Carlton
Party	Candidate	Votes	%	±%
Labor	Bill Barry	15,862	78.2	
Communist	Gerald O'Day	4,430	21.8	
Total formal votes		20,292	92.9	
Informal votes		1,554	7.1	
Turnout		21,846	85.4	
Labor hold		Swing		

1943 Victorian state election: Carlton
Party	Candidate	Votes	%	±%
Labor	Bill Barry	11,408	62.4	−8.9
Communist	Gerald O'Day	3,973	21.7	+13.3
Independent	Richard Bowers	2,889	15.8	+15.8
Total formal votes		18,270	95.5	−0.3
Informal votes		862	4.5	+0.3
Turnout		19,132	84.2	−4.6
Labor hold		Swing	N/A	

- Preferences were not distributed.

1940 Victorian state election: Carlton
Party	Candidate	Votes	%	±%
Labor	Bill Barry	13,058	71.3	−28.7
United Australia	David Mandie	3,716	20.3	+20.3
Communist	Ralph Gibson	1,547	8.4	+8.4
Total formal votes		18,321	95.8	
Informal votes		804	4.2	
Turnout		19,125	88.8	
Two-party-preferred result
Labor	Bill Barry		78.9	
United Australia	David Mandie		21.1	
Labor hold		Swing	N/A	

- Two party preferred vote was estimated.

=== Elections in the 1930s ===
1937 Victorian state election: Carlton
Party	Candidate	Votes	%	±%
Labor	Bill Barry	unopposed		
Labor hold		Swing		

1935 Victorian state election: Carlton
Party	Candidate	Votes	%	±%
Labor	Bill Barry	11,397	60.3	−1.7
United Australia	Francis Nelson	5,166	27.2	−10.7
Communist	Gerald O'Day	2,340	12.4	+12.4
Total formal votes		18,903	96.8	−0.4
Informal votes		629	3.2	+0.4
Turnout		19,532	91.9	+0.6
Two-party-preferred result
Labor	Bill Barry		71.5	+9.5
United Australia	Francis Nelson		29.5	−9.5
Labor hold		Swing	+9.5	

- Two party preferred vote was estimated.

1932 Carlton state by-election
Party	Candidate	Votes	%	±%
Labor	Bill Barry	8,649	50.5	−11.5
United Australia	William Townsend	6,212	36.3	−1.7
Communist	Gerald O'Day	2,258	13.2	+13.2
Total formal votes		17,119	97.0	−0.2
Informal votes		530	3.0	+0.2
Turnout		17,649	87.3	−4.0
Labor hold		Swing	N/A	

- Preferences were not distributed.

1932 Victorian state election: Carlton
Party	Candidate	Votes	%	±%
Labor	Robert Solly	11,065	62.0	−38.0
United Australia	David Crone	6,769	38.0	+38.0
Total formal votes		17,834	97.2	
Informal votes		521	2.8	
Turnout		18,355	91.3	
Labor hold		Swing		

=== Elections in the 1920s ===
1929 Victorian state election: Carlton
Party	Candidate	Votes	%	±%
Labor	Robert Solly	unopposed		
Labor hold		Swing		

1927 Victorian state election: Carlton
Party	Candidate	Votes	%	±%
Labor	Robert Solly	14,470	73.9	
Australian Liberal	Roderick McSolvin	5,102	26.1	
Total formal votes		19,572	98.3	
Informal votes		332	1.7	
Turnout		19,904	90.3	
Labor hold		Swing		

1924 Victorian state election: Carlton
Party	Candidate	Votes	%	±%
Labor	Robert Solly	unopposed		
Labor hold		Swing		

1921 Victorian state election: Carlton
Party	Candidate	Votes	%	±%
Labor	Robert Solly	unopposed		
Labor hold		Swing		

1920 Victorian state election: Carlton
Party	Candidate	Votes	%	±%
Labor	Robert Solly	unopposed		
Labor hold		Swing		

=== Elections in the 1910s ===
1917 Victorian state election: Carlton
Party	Candidate	Votes	%	±%
Labor	Robert Solly	unopposed		
Labor hold		Swing		

1914 Victorian state election: Carlton
Party	Candidate	Votes	%	±%
Labor	Robert Solly	unopposed		
Labor hold		Swing		

1911 Victorian state election: Carlton
Party	Candidate	Votes	%	±%
Labor	Robert Solly	4,735	71.7	N/A
Liberal	John Gardiner	1,866	28.3	+28.3
Total formal votes		6,601	98.6	
Informal votes		91	1.4	
Turnout		6,692	54.5	
Labor hold		Swing	N/A	
