= Timeline of Australian elections =

This article provides a timeline of elections in Australia, including all the colonial, state, territorial and federal elections. The information starts from when each state or territory held its first election, and continues through to the present day.

== About the tables ==
The background colour indicates which party won the election. All six states and both territories have established limits on the length of a parliamentary term, with the federal parliament limited to three years, and all state and territorial parliaments limited to a four-year term. In addition the federal government have changed to fixed election dates every three years, and both territories and all states except Tasmania have changed to fixed election dates every four years. For these legislatures, the box is shown as running until the next scheduled election, but one could still be earlier if the government falls due to a motion of no confidence.

Colour	Party	Colour	Party
	Labor		Liberal
	Country/National		Liberal National
	Country Liberal		United Australia
	CPNP		Nationalist
	Free Trade/Anti-Socialist		Commonwealth Liberal
	Progressive		Liberal and Country League
	Liberal		Protectionist
	Opposition		Liberal Reform
	Nonpartisan		Ministerial

== 1851–1900 ==
Year	WA	SA	Qld	NSW	Vic	Tas
1856				1st	1st	1st
1857		1st		1st	1st	1st
1858		1st		2nd	1st	1st
1859		1st		3rd	2nd	1st
1860		2nd	1st	4th	2nd	1st
1861		2nd	1st	4th	3rd	2nd
1862		3rd	1st	4th	3rd	3rd
1863		3rd	2nd	4th	3rd	3rd
1864		3rd	2nd	4th	4th	3rd
1865		4th	2nd	5th	4th	3rd
1866		4th	2nd	5th	5th	4th
1867		4th	3rd	5th	5th	4th
1868		5th	4th	5th	6th	4th
1869		5th	4th	5th	6th	4th
1870		6th	5th	6th	6th	4th
1871		7th	6th	6th	7th	5th
1872		7th	6th	7th	7th	6th
1873		7th	7th	7th	7th	6th
1874		7th	7th	7th	8th	6th
1875		8th	7th	8th	8th	6th
1876		8th	7th	8th	8th	6th
1877		8th	7th	9th	9th	7th
1878		9th	8th	9th	9th	7th
1879		9th	8th	9th	10th	7th
1880		9th	8th	10th	11th	7th
1881		10th	8th	10th	11th	7th
1882		10th	8th	11th	11th	8th
1883		10th	9th	11th	12th	8th
1884		11th	9th	11th	12th	8th
1885		11th	9th	12th	12th	8th
1886		11th	9th	12th	13th	9th
1887		12th	9th	13th	13th	9th
1888		12th	10th	13th	13th	9th
1889		12th	10th	14th	14th	9th
1890	1st	13th	10th	14th	14th	9th
1891	1st	13th	10th	15th	14th	10th
1892	1st	13th	10th	15th	15th	10th
1893	1st	14th	11th	15th	15th	11th
1894	2nd	14th	11th	16th	16th	11th
1895	2nd	14th	11th	17th	16th	11th
1896	2nd	15th	12th	17th	16th	11th
1897	3rd	15th	12th	17th	17th	12th
1898	3rd	15th	12th	18th	17th	12th
1899	3rd	16th	13th	18th	17th	12th
1900	3rd	16th	13th	18th	18th	13th
Year	WA	SA	Qld	NSW	Vic	Tas

== 1901–1973 ==
Year	WA	SA	Qld	NSW	Vic	Tas	Federal
1901	4th			19th			1st
1902	4th	17th	14th	19th	19th		1st
1903	4th	17th	14th	19th	19th	14th	2nd
1904	5th	17th	15th	20th	20th	14th	2nd
1905	6th	18th	15th	20th	20th	14th	2nd
1906	6th	19th	15th	20th	20th	15th	3rd
1907	6th	19th	16th	21st	21st	15th	3rd
1908	7th	19th	17th	21st	22nd	15th	3rd
1909	7th	19th	18th	21st	22nd	16th	3rd
1910	7th	20th	18th	22nd	22nd	16th	4th
1911	8th	20th	18th	22nd	23rd	16th	4th
1912	8th	21st	19th	22nd	23rd	17th	4th
1913	8th	21st	19th	23rd	23rd	18th	5th
1914	9th	21st	19th	23rd	24th	18th	6th
1915	9th	22nd	20th	23rd	24th	18th	6th
1916	9th	22nd	20th	23rd	24th	19th	6th
1917	10th	22nd	20th	24th	25th	19th	7th
1918	10th	23rd	21st	24th	25th	19th	7th
1919	10th	23rd	21st	24th	25th	20th	8th
1920	10th	23rd	22nd	25th	26th	20th	8th
1921	11th	24th	22nd	25th	27th	20th	8th
1922	11th	24th	22nd	26th	27th	21st	9th
1923	11th	24th	23rd	26th	27th	21st	9th
1924	12th	25th	23rd	26th	28th	21st	9th
1925	12th	25th	23rd	27th	28th	22nd	10th
1926	12th	25th	24th	27th	28th	22nd	10th
1927	13th	26th	24th	28th	29th	22nd	10th
1928	13th	26th	24th	28th	29th	23rd	11th
1929	13th	26th	25th	28th	30th	23rd	12th
1930	14th	27th	25th	29th	30th	23rd	12th
1931	14th	27th	25th	29th	30th	24th	13th
1932	14th	27th	26th	30th	31st	24th	13th
1933	15th	28th	26th	30th	31st	24th	13th
1934	15th	28th	26th	30th	31st	25th	14th
1935	15th	28th	27th	31st	32nd	25th	14th
1936	16th	28th	27th	31st	32nd	25th	14th
1937	16th	28th	27th	31st	33rd	26th	15th
1938	16th	29th	28th	32nd	33rd	26th	15th
1939	17th	29th	28th	32nd	33rd	26th	15th
1940	17th	29th	28th	32nd	34th	26th	16th
1941	17th	30th	29th	33rd	34th	27th	16th
1942	17th	30th	29th	33rd	34th	27th	16th
1943	18th	30th	29th	33rd	35th	27th	17th
1944	18th	31st	30th	34th	35th	27th	17th
1945	18th	31st	30th	34th	36th	27th	17th
1946	18th	31st	30th	34th	36th	28th	18th
1947	19th	32nd	31st	35th	37th	28th	18th
1948	19th	32nd	31st	35th	37th	29th	18th
1949	19th	32nd	31st	35th	37th	29th	19th
1950	20th	33rd	32nd	36th	38th	30th	19th
1951	20th	33rd	32nd	36th	38th	30th	20th
1952	20th	33rd	32nd	36th	39th	30th	20th
1953	21st	34th	33rd	37th	39th	30th	20th
1954	21st	34th	33rd	37th	39th	30th	21st
1955	21st	34th	33rd	37th	40th	31st	22nd
1956	22nd	35th	34th	38th	40th	32nd	22nd
1957	22nd	35th	35th	38th	40th	32nd	22nd
1958	22nd	35th	35th	38th	41st	32nd	23rd
1959	23rd	36th	35th	39th	41st	33rd	23rd
1960	23rd	36th	36th	39th	41st	33rd	23rd
1961	23rd	36th	36th	39th	42nd	33rd	24th
1962	24th	37th	36th	40th	42nd	33rd	24th
1963	24th	37th	37th	40th	42nd	33rd	25th
1964	24th	37th	37th	40th	43rd	34th	25th
1965	25th	38th	37th	41st	43rd	34th	25th
1966	25th	38th	38th	41st	43rd	34th	26th
1967	25th	38th	38th	41st	44th	34th	26th
1968	26th	39th	38th	42nd	44th	34th	26th
1969	26th	39th	39th	42nd	44th	35th	27th
1970	26th	40th	39th	42nd	45th	35th	27th
1971	27th	40th	39th	43rd	45th	35th	27th
1972	27th	40th	40th	43rd	45th	36th	28th
1973	27th	41st	40th	44th	46th	36th	28th
Year	WA	SA	Qld	NSW	Vic	Tas	Federal

== 1974–present ==
Year	WA	SA	NT	Qld	NSW	ACT	Vic	Tas	Federal
1974	28th		1st	41st					29th
1975	28th	42nd	1st	41st					30th
1976	28th	42nd	1st	41st	45th		47th	37th	30th
1977	29th	43rd	2nd	42nd	45th		47th	37th	31st
1978	29th	43rd	2nd	42nd	46th		47th	37th	31st
1979	29th	44th	2nd	42nd	46th		48th	38th	31st
1980	30th	44th	3rd	43rd	46th		48th	38th	32nd
1981	30th	44th	3rd	43rd	47th		48th	38th	32nd
1982	30th	45th	3rd	43rd	47th		49th	39th	32nd
1983	31st	45th	4th	44th	47th		49th	39th	33rd
1984	31st	45th	4th	44th	48th		49th	39th	34th
1985	31st	46th	4th	44th	48th		50th	39th	34th
1986	32nd	46th	4th	45th	48th		50th	40th	34th
1987	32nd	46th	5th	45th	48th		50th	40th	35th
1988	32nd	46th	5th	45th	49th		51st	40th	35th
1989	33rd	47th	5th	46th	49th	1st	51st	41st	35th
1990	33rd	47th	6th	46th	49th	1st	51st	41st	36th
1991	33rd	47th	6th	46th	50th	1st	51st	41st	36th
1992	33rd	47th	6th	47th	50th	2nd	52nd	42nd	36th
1993	34th	48th	6th	47th	50th	2nd	52nd	42nd	37th
1994	34th	48th	7th	47th	50th	2nd	52nd	42nd	37th
1995	34th	48th	7th	48th	51st	3rd	52nd	42nd	37th
1996	35th	48th	7th	48th	51st	3rd	53rd	43rd	38th
1997	35th	49th	8th	48th	51st	3rd	53rd	43rd	38th
1998	35th	49th	8th	49th	51st	4th	53rd	44th	39th
1999	35th	49th	8th	49th	52nd	4th	54th	44th	39th
2000	35th	49th	8th	49th	52nd	4th	54th	44th	39th
2001	36th	49th	9th	50th	52nd	5th	54th	44th	40th
2002	36th	50th	9th	50th	52nd	5th	55th	45th	40th
2003	36th	50th	9th	50th	53rd	5th	55th	45th	40th
2004	36th	50th	9th	51st	53rd	6th	55th	45th	41st
2005	37th	50th	10th	51st	53rd	6th	55th	45th	41st
2006	37th	51st	10th	52nd	53rd	6th	56th	46th	41st
2007	37th	51st	10th	52nd	54th	6th	56th	46th	42nd
2008	38th	51st	11th	52nd	54th	7th	56th	46th	42nd
2009	38th	51st	11th	53rd	54th	7th	56th	46th	42nd
2010	38th	52nd	11th	53rd	54th	7th	57th	47th	43rd
2011	38th	52nd	11th	53rd	55th	7th	57th	47th	43rd
2012	38th	52nd	12th	54th	55th	8th	57th	47th	43rd
2013	39th	52nd	12th	54th	55th	8th	57th	47th	44th
2014	39th	53rd	12th	54th	55th	8th	58th	48th	44th
2015	39th	53rd	12th	55th	56th	8th	58th	48th	44th
2016	39th	53rd	13th	55th	56th	9th	58th	48th	45th
2017	40th	53rd	13th	56th	56th	9th	58th	48th	45th
2018	40th	54th	13th	56th	56th	9th	59th	49th	45th
2019	40th	54th	13th	56th	57th	9th	59th	49th	46th
2020	40th	54th	14th	57th	57th	10th	59th	49th	46th
2021	41st	54th	14th	57th	57th	10th	59th	50th	46th
2022	41st	55th	14th	57th	57th	10th	60th	50th	47th
2023	41st	55th	14th	57th	58th	10th	60th	50th	47th
2024	41st	55th	15th	58th	58th	11th	60th	51st	47th
2025	42nd	55th	15th	58th	58th	11th	60th	52nd	48th
2026	42nd	56th	15th	58th	58th	11th	61st		48th
2027	42nd		15th	58th	59th	11th			48th
2028	42nd		16th	59th		12th			49th
2029	43rd							53rd
Year	WA	SA	NT	Qld	NSW	ACT	Vic	Tas	Federal

== See also ==
- List of Australian federal elections
- List of New South Wales state elections
- List of Northern Territory general elections
- List of elections in South Australia
- List of elections in Victoria
- List of Western Australian Legislative Assembly elections
