= John Madden (judge) =

Australian politician (1844–1918)

Sir John Madden
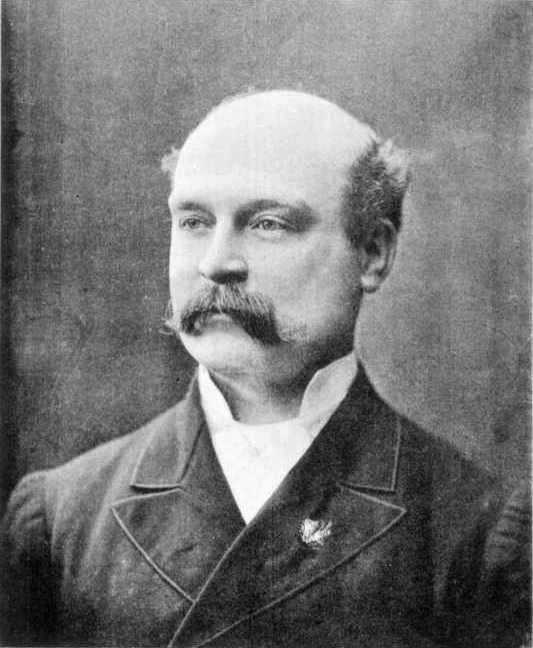
- Madden in 1893

Chief Justice of Victoria
- In office 9 January 1893 – 10 March 1918
- Preceded by: George Higinbotham
- Succeeded by: William Irvine

Personal details
- Born: 16 May 1844 Cloyne, County Cork, Ireland
- Died: 10 March 1918 (aged 73) South Yarra, Victoria, Australia
- Spouse: Gertrude Stephen (m. 1872)
- Profession: Politician, judge

Sir John Madden, GCMG (16 May 1844 – 10 March 1918) was an Australian judge and politician who was the fourth and longest-serving Chief Justice of Victoria, in office from 1893 until his death. He was acting governor on a number of occasions.

== Background and early years ==
Madden was born in the village of Cloyne, near Cork, Ireland, in 1844, the second of seven sons of a Cork solicitor also named John Madden. The family moved to London, UK in 1852, where his father had taken a job managing an insurance company, and there Madden attended a private school. He also spent some time at a college in Beauchamp, France. In January 1857, the family emigrated to Melbourne, Australia, where John Madden senior was admitted as a barrister to the Victorian Bar. The family lived in the suburb of Flemington. Madden was enrolled in St Patrick's College in East Melbourne. He later studied at the University of Melbourne, graduating with a Bachelor of Arts in 1864, a Bachelor of Laws in 1865.

== Legal and political career ==
Madden was admitted to the Victorian Bar on 14 September 1865, where he established a good reputation for himself, particularly in equity and criminal law matters. In 1869, he received a Doctorate of Laws degree from the University of Melbourne. He stood for election to the Victorian Legislative Assembly in 1871, for the seat of West Bourke, but was unsuccessful. In 1872, he married Gertrude Stephen, with whom Madden subsequently had one son and five daughters. Madden was elected for the seat of West Bourke at the subsequent election, and in October 1875 was made the Minister for Justice in the McCulloch government. He lost his seat at the following election, but was temporarily retained as Minister for Justice until 1876, when he was elected to the Assembly for the seat of Sandridge. After McCulloch's resignation in May 1877, Madden left the ministry, but returned in March 1880 when he was made Minister for Justice in the Service government. This government only lasted five months, however.

Madden retired from politics in 1883 to concentrate on his successful legal practice, which flourished during the Victorian land boom of the 1880s. He was considered one of the leaders of the Victorian Bar at this time, to the extent that by 1890, he was involved in about thirty percent of all cases coming before the Supreme Court of Victoria. In 1887, he had a thirty-room mansion built for himself and his family in Chapel Street in St Kilda East. It was named Cloyne, after the town where he was born. The property is currently owned by the Salvation Army. He was offered judicial positions several times, and rejected them, however after Chief Justice George Higinbotham died in late 1892, Madden was offered his position, and became the next Chief Justice on 9 January 1893. He was knighted later that year.

One of the more interesting cases that Madden presided over was Bloomfield v Dunlop Tyre Co Ltd, decided 8 May 1902, and thought to be the first court case involving a car accident in Victoria. A demonstration vehicle owned by the Australasian Dunlop Tyre company was being driven towards the Royal Melbourne Showgrounds by the general manager and the advertising manager of the company. As they were passing the Flemington Racecourse, they slowed but did not stop, and after startling some horses, they collided with one, injuring its leg. The horse's owner sued Dunlop Tyres. The case came before Madden, who admitted that he didn't know anything about cars, and requested a demonstration outside the court building in William Street. After viewing the car's performance, and the driving skill of the two managers, he promptly found in favour of the horse owner, awarding him £250 in damages. Madden, however, quickly warmed to automobiles and became the first president of the Royal Automobile Club of Victoria in 1903.. in 1911 Sir John accepted the role of President of The Melbourne Savage Club, a position he enjoyed and held until his demise in 1918.

== Civic leadership roles ==
Aside from his political and judicial work, Madden was the vice-chancellor of the University of Melbourne from 3 June 1889 to 20 December 1897 and then chancellor until his death in 1918. In 1899 he was appointed as Lieutenant-Governor of Victoria, and was made a Knight Commander of the Order of St Michael and St George (KCMG) later that year. When Governor of Victoria Sir John Fuller was away in the United Kingdom in 1913, Madden assumed his role after a motion of no confidence was successfully moved against Premier of Victoria William Watt. Madden caused some controversy when instead of appointing Donald McLeod of the Commonwealth Liberal Party, he appointed Labor leader George Elmslie. Elmslie's term in office lasted only thirteen days before his appointment was rejected by the Legislative Assembly.

In 1905, members of the Victorian Bar donated a sum of money to the University of Melbourne in recognition of Madden's services to the university and the community; the sum funds the John Madden Exhibitions, awarded to students of law. In 1906, he was elevated to Knight Grand Cross of the Order of St Michael and St George (GCMG). When the Historical Society of Victoria was formed on 21 May 1909, Madden was made its first patron.

== Arms ==
Coat of arms of John Madden

Notes
Confirmed 20 October 1897 by Sir Arthur Edward Vicars, Ulster King of Arms.
Crest
On a wreath of the colours a falcon wings expanded Argent charged on the breast with a trefoil slipped Sable and holding in the dexter claw a cross botonnee of the last.
Escutcheon
Per pale Sable and Gules a falcon preying on a duck Argent on a chief Or a cross botonnee between two trefoils slipped Gules.
Motto
Propria Virtute Audax

== Death ==
Madden died suddenly in 1918, and was buried in the Melbourne General Cemetery. He was survived by his wife and six children.

== See also ==
- Judiciary of Australia
- List of Judges of the Supreme Court of Victoria

Legal offices
Preceded by George Higinbotham	Chief Justice of the Supreme Court of Victoria; 1893 – 1918	Succeeded by William Irvine
Academic offices
Preceded by Martin Irving	Vice-Chancellor of the University of Melbourne; 1889 – 1897	Succeeded by Sir Henry Wrixon
Preceded by Sir Anthony Brownless	Chancellor of the University of Melbourne; 1897 – 1918	Succeeded by Sir John MacFarland
