= William Trenwith =

Australian politician

The Honourable William Trenwith
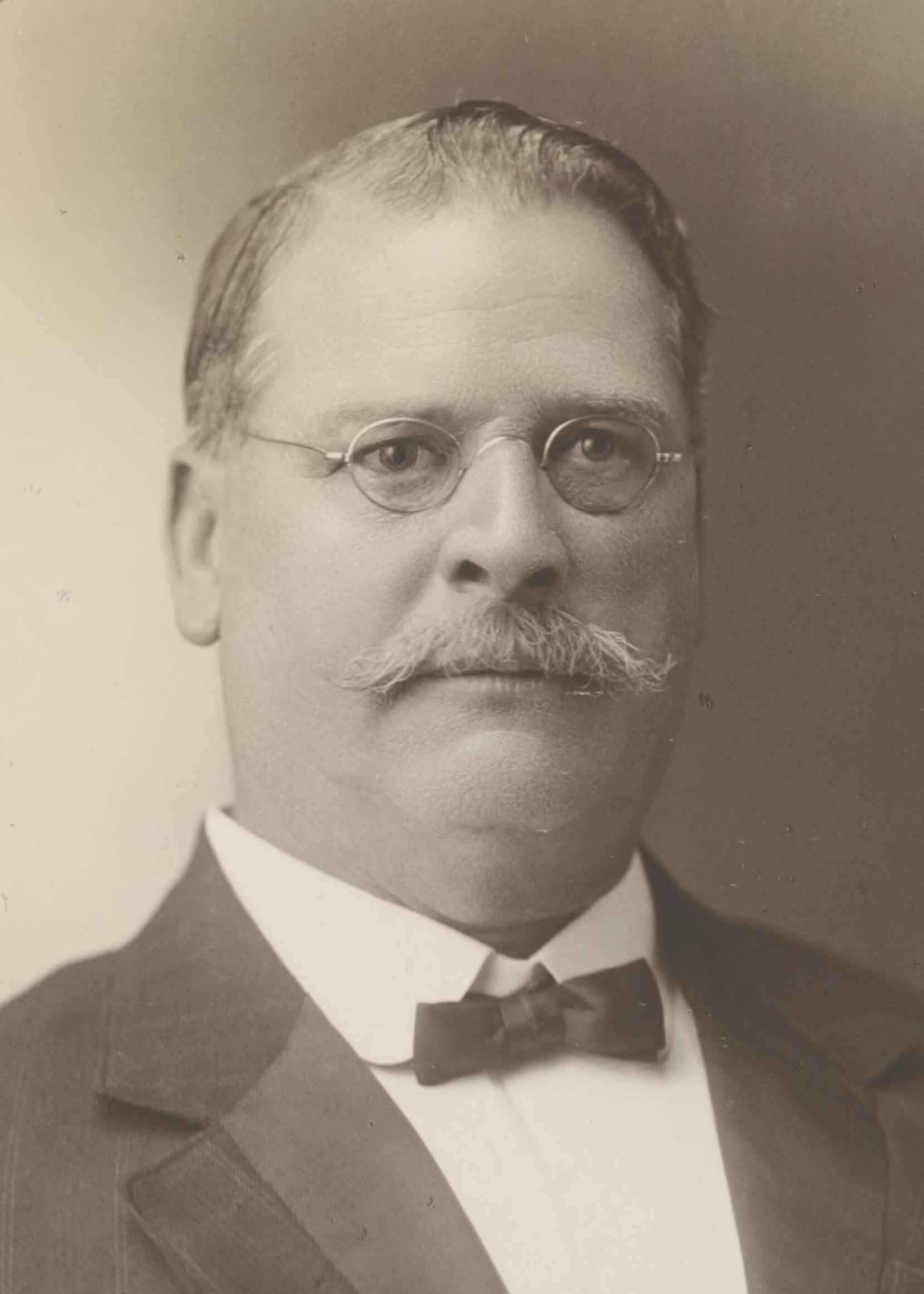

1st Leader of the Labour Party in Victoria Elections: 1894, 1897, 1900
- In office 21 April 1892 – 3 December 1900
- Preceded by: Position Established
- Succeeded by: Frederick Bromley

Member of the Victorian Legislative Assembly for Richmond
- In office 28 March 1889 – 18 November 1903
- Preceded by: Charles Smith
- Succeeded by: George Roberts

Senator for Victoria
- In office 1 January 1904 – 30 June 1910

Personal details
- Born: William Arthur Trenwith; 15 July 1846 Launceston, Tasmania
- Died: 26 July 1925 (aged 79) Camberwell, Victoria, Australia
- Party: United Labour Party; Independent (1904–09); Liberal (1909–10)
- Spouses: Susannah Page (m. 1868; died 1896); Elizabeth Bright (m. 1896; died 1923); Helen Florence Sinclair (m. 1924–1925)
- Children: 7
- Occupation: Bootmaker, union secretary

William Arthur Trenwith (15 July 1846 – 26 July 1925) was an Australian labour movement politician and pioneer trade union official who served as the 1st leader of the Victorian branch of the Australian Labor Party (Labour Party) from 1892 to 1900. He also served as senator for Victoria from 1904 to 1910.

== Early life ==
Born to convict parents in Launceston, Tasmania, Trenwith followed his father's trade as a bootmaker. Largely unschooled, barely literate, and with poor eyesight, he had a gift for oratory and public speaking which would assist him in union organising and later as a politician. He was involved during the late 1870s with the National Reform League, where he agitated for protective tariffs, a land tax, and reform of the Victorian Legislative Council.

== Labour movement ==
As one of the founding members of the Victorian Operative Bootmakers Union in 1879, Trenwith served as its secretary in 1883. He was instrumental in coordinating the 1884 bootmakers' strike from Melbourne Trades Hall, which saw Victoria's first fullscale picketing and was an important campaign in the fight against sweated labour. He advocated the abolition of outwork in the bootmaking industry to eliminate cheap labour and encourage unionisation.

Trenwith honed his public oratory skills at North Wharf on the banks of the Yarra River in Melbourne on Sunday afternoons, along with Joseph Symes, Chummy Fleming, and Monty Miller, as well as many other Australian labour movement activists and radicals of the time.

In 1886, he was elected president of the Trades Hall Council and was also made a Life Governor of the Homeopathic Hospital. By 1890, he was seen as a bureaucrat and was opposed by radicals such as Fleming, who accused Trenwith and other moderate THC bureaucrats of "working with blood-sucking capitalists".

== Victorian politics ==
After a number of attempts at nomination, Trenwith was elected in May 1889 for the seat of Richmond to the Victorian Legislative Assembly on a labour platform and sought reforms in education, unemployment, and tariff protection. During the 1890 maritime strike, he argued strongly for compulsory arbitration over direct action, much to the disgust of labour radicals. He was the lone labour representative in the Victorian parliament until the following election in April 1892, when 13 labour-aligned candidates were elected.

During 1892, Trenwith was elected leader of the Victorian Labour Party but continued to have problems at the grassroots level due to strong opposition from public meetings chaired by Chummy Fleming. In 1893, Trenwith opposed Fleming's proposal for the affiliation of the Knights of Labor to the Trades Hall Council on the grounds that as a secret organisation, it could not be organised industrially.

Trenwith served as Minister for Railways, Commissioner for Public Works, and Vice-President of the Board of Land and Works between November 1900 and February 1901 in the Sir Alexander Peacock ministry, and briefly served as Chief Secretary (1901–02). The government he was part of came under attack in November 1902 from a Trades Hall motion from Fleming protesting against the reduction of old age pensions from 10/- to 8/-.

== Federal politics ==
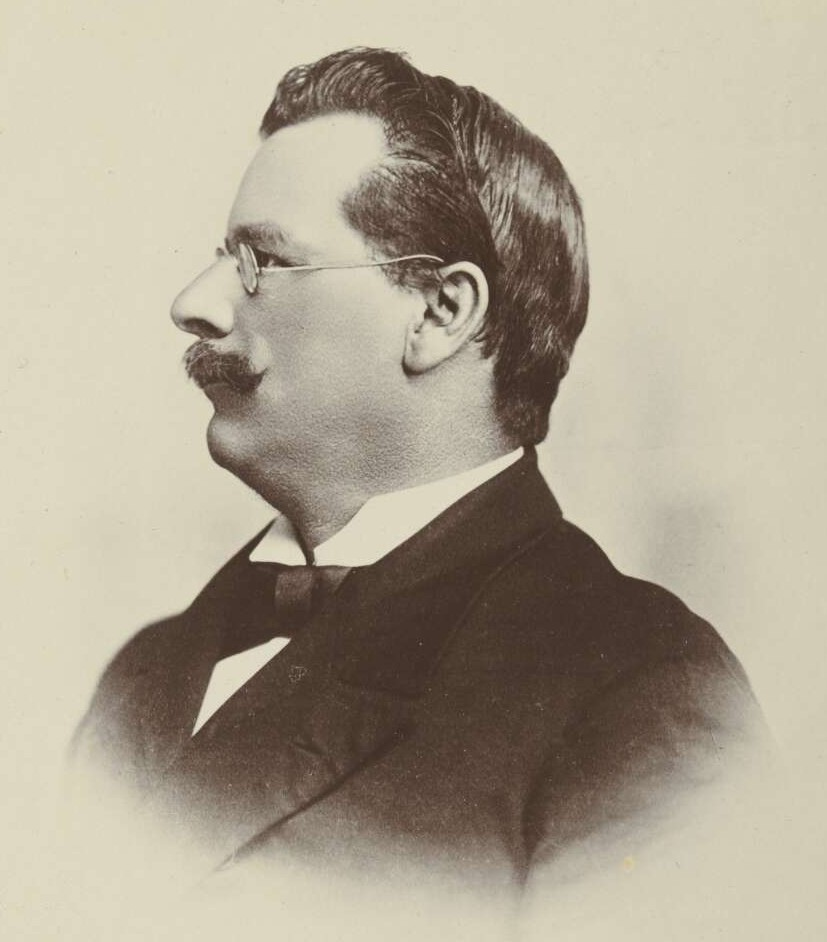
Trenwith at the 1898 Australasian Federal Convention.

Trenwith was the only elected labour representative at the 1897–98 Federal Constitutional Convention, which drafted a constitution for the federation of the six Australian colonies which went into effect in 1901. His support for federation was over the objections of most in the labour movement and served to ameliorate accusations from The Age that the Federation Bill had been "wholly shaped in a conservative direction".

From 1903 to 1910, he served as an independent senator for Victoria. Trenwith's withdrawal of support for the Federal Labor government of Andrew Fisher resulted in his defeat at the following election and subsequent retirement from federal politics.

He attempted to return to Victorian state politics at the 1911 Victorian state election, unsuccessfully contesting the seat of Gippsland North on behalf of the People's Party against the sitting Labor MLA James McLachlan.

== Personal life and death ==
Trenwith was married three times. His first marriage was to Susannah Page on 2 November 1868, with whom he would have four children, a daughter and three sons. Page died in 1896. His second marriage was to Elizabeth Bright on 7 April 1896, with whom he would have three children, a daughter and two sons. Bright died in 1923. His third marriage was to Helen Florence Sinclair on 1 October 1924.

Trenwith died in Melbourne on 26 July 1925, aged 79, survived by his third wife and his seven children.
