= Public and Railway Officers Province =

Former electoral province of the Victorian Legislative Council, Australia

Public and Railway Officers Province Victoria—Legislative Council
- State: Victoria
- Created: 1904
- Abolished: 1907

The Public and Railway Officers seat was an electorate of the Victorian Legislative Council. The 1903 Constitution Act reserved one seat in the Legislative Assembly to be elected by and from Public Officers and similarly two seats for Railway Officers, and one seat in the Legislative Council for both groups combined. In 1907, these four seats were abolished and such officers voted instead in their electoral district and province and were otherwise prohibited from political campaigning.

== Members of Public and Railway Officers ==
Member	Party	Term
William Evans	Labor	Jun 1904 – Mar 1907

== See also ==
- Parliaments of the Australian states and territories
- List of members of the Victorian Legislative Council
