= List of New South Wales state elections =

This article provides a summary of results for elections to the New South Wales Legislative Assembly, the lower house in New South Wales's bicameral state legislative body, the Parliament of New South Wales, which came into being in 1856 when New South Wales achieved responsible government. New South Wales politics were initially non-partisan, with individual Members of Parliament choosing to align either with the Government or the Opposition. This changed at the 1887 election where, for the first time, candidates were members of official political parties. The first two major parties to form were the Free Trade Party and the Protectionist Party. The 1887 election saw the 79 members of the Free Trade Party elected form the government with the 37 elected Protectionist Party members form the opposition. The next election saw the Free Trade Party retain government but with a reduced majority. The 1891 saw the Labor Party for the first time. These three parties then fought out the next two elections through to 1898. After Federation in 1901, the Free Trade Party changed their name to the Liberal Reform Party with the Protectionists becoming the Progressive Party.

The 1904 election saw a massive defeat of the Progressive government and for the first time Labor became the major opposition party. Most of the Progressive members stood as the Liberals at the next election and the party folded not long after that. Labor won an outright majority for the first time at the 1910 election and increased it further in 1913. The Liberal Reform Party became the Nationalist Party of Australia in 1917 and Labor's main opposition through to 1932 when the conservatives became the United Australia Party and then the Liberal Party in 1945.

== General election dates ==
- 1901 New South Wales state election, held 3 July 1901
- 1904 New South Wales state election, held 6 August 1904
- 1907 New South Wales state election, held 10 September 1907
- 1910 New South Wales state election, held 14 October 1910
- 1913 New South Wales state election, held 6 December 1913
- 1917 New South Wales state election, held 24 March 1917
- 1920 New South Wales state election, held 20 March 1920
- 1922 New South Wales state election, held 25 February 1922
- 1925 New South Wales state election, held 30 May 1925
- 1927 New South Wales state election, held 8 October 1927
- 1930 New South Wales state election, held 25 October 1930
- 1932 New South Wales state election, held 11 June 1932
- 1935 New South Wales state election, held 11 May 1935
- 1938 New South Wales state election, held 26 March 1938
- 1941 New South Wales state election, held 10 May 1941
- 1944 New South Wales state election, held 27 May 1944
- 1947 New South Wales state election, held 3 May 1947
- 1950 New South Wales state election, held 17 June 1950
- 1953 New South Wales state election, held 14 February 1953
- 1956 New South Wales state election, held 3 March 1956
- 1959 New South Wales state election, held 21 March 1959
- 1962 New South Wales state election, held 3 March 1962
- 1965 New South Wales state election, held 1 May 1965
- 1968 New South Wales state election, held 24 February 1968
- 1971 New South Wales state election, held 13 February 1971
- 1973 New South Wales state election, held 17 November 1973
- 1976 New South Wales state election, held 1 May 1976
- 1978 New South Wales state election, held 7 October 1978
- 1981 New South Wales state election, held 19 September 1981
- 1984 New South Wales state election, held 24 March 1984
- 1988 New South Wales state election, held 19 March 1988
- 1991 New South Wales state election, held 25 May 1991
- 1995 New South Wales state election, held 25 March 1995
- 1999 New South Wales state election, held 27 March 1999
- 2003 New South Wales state election, held 22 March 2003
- 2007 New South Wales state election, held 24 March 2007
- 2011 New South Wales state election, held 26 March 2011
- 2015 New South Wales state election, held 28 March 2015
- 2019 New South Wales state election, held 23 March 2019
- 2023 New South Wales state election, held 25 March 2023
- 2027 New South Wales state election, to be held 13 March 2027

== Results ==
The table below shows the total number of seats won by the major political parties at each election. The totals of the winning party or coalition are shown in bold, while other parties in government are shown in bold italic. Full details on any election are linked via the year of the election at the start of the row.

Year	Total seats	Labor	Country Labor	Liberal	UAP	Nationalist	Progressive	Liberal Reform ^{[A]}	Protectionist ^{[B]}	Free Trade	Country/ National ^{[C]}	DLP	Lang Labor	Greens	SFF	Independent										Other Parties
Year	Total seats	Labor	Country Labor	Liberal	UAP	Nationalist	Progressive	Liberal Reform ^{[A]}	Protectionist ^{[B]}	Free Trade	Country/ National ^{[C]}	DLP	Lang Labor	Greens	SFF	Ind	Lab	Lib	UAP	Nat	Prog	LR	Prot	FTP	C/N	Other Parties
2023	93	**45**		36							11			3		9
2019	93	36		**35**							**13**			3	3	3
2015	93	34		**37**							**17**			3		2
2011	93	20		**51**							**18**			1		3
2007	93	**50**	**2**	22							13					6
2003	93	**52**	**3**	20							12					6
1999	93	**55**		20							13					5
1995	99	**50**		29							17					3
1991	99	46		**32**							**17**					4
1988	109	43		**39**							**20**					7
1984	99	**58**		22							15					4
1981	98	**69**		14							14					2
1978	99	**63**		18							17					1
1976	99	**50**		30							18					1
1973	99	44		**34**							**18**	1				2
1971	96	45		**32**							**17**					2
1968	94	39		**36**							**17**					2
1965	94	45		**31**							**16**					1		1
1962	94	**54**		25							14						1
1959	94	**46**		29							17						2
1956	94	**50**		27							15					1	1
1953	94	**57**		22							14					1
1950	94	**46**		29							17					2
1947	90	**52**		19							15		2			2
1944	90	**56**		12							10		2			5		4		1
1941	90	**54**			14						12					4	1		5
1938	90	28			**37**						**22**					1										2	Heffron Lab.
1935	90				**38**						**23**		29
1932	90				**43**						**23**		24
1930	90	**55**				23					12
1927	90	40				**33**					**13**						2			2
1925	90	**46**				32					9					1				1						1	Protestant Lab.
1922	90	36				**41**					**9**					2										1; 1	Ind. Coalitionist; Democratic
1920	90	**43**				28					15					1				2						1	Socialist Lab.
1917	90	33				**52**										3	1			1
1913	90	**49**						28			11					1	1
1910	90	**46**						37								1						6
1907	90	32					5	**45**								4						4
1904	90	25					16	**45**								2						2
1901	125	**24**					**42**	37								12	4						2	4
1898	125	19							**52**	45						4								4	1
1895	125	18							42	**58**							1						2	4
1894	125	15							37	**50**							8						4	11
1891	141	35							**52**	44						1	1						4	4
1889	137								66	**71**
1887	124								37	**79**													4	4

=== Notes ===
^{A} At the 1913 election they dropped "and Reform" from their name and were known as simply as the Liberal Party.
^{B} At the 1898 election they were known as the National Federal Party.
^{C} Includes results for the Farmers and Settlers Association and the Country Party Association at the 1913 election as well for the second Progressive Party at the 1920, 1922 and 1925 elections. First contested as the Country Party at the 1927 election. At the 1981 election they were known as the National Country Party. From 1984 election onwards they been contesting as the National Party.

== See also ==
- Timeline of Australian elections
- Electoral results for the Australian Senate in New South Wales
