= List of Northern Territory general elections =

The following is a summary of results for general elections in the Northern Territory. The assembly consisted of 19 members at its creation in 1974, but was increased to its present size of 25 for the 1983 election.

The table below shows the total number of seats won by the major political parties at each election. The winning party's total is shown in bold. Full details on any election are linked via the year of the election at the start of the row.

Year	CLP	ALP	Territory Alliance	NT Nationals	Independent	Total seats
2024	**17**	4			4 (Note: Includes 1 seat won by Greens.)	25
2020	8	**14**	1		2	25
2016	2	**18**			5	25
2012	**16**	8			1	25
2008	11	**13**			1	25
2005	4	**19**			2	25
2001	10	**13**			2	25
1997	**18**	7			0	25
1994	**17**	7			1	25
1990	**14**	9		0	2	25
1987	**16**	6		1	2	25
1983	**19**	6			0	25
1980	**11**	7			1	19
1977	**12**	6			1	19
1974	**17**	0			2	19

== See also ==
- List of Northern Territory by-elections
- Timeline of Australian elections
- Electoral results for the Australian Senate in the Northern Territory
