= Henry Creswick =

Australian cricketer

Personal information
- Born: 13 April 1824; Sheffield, England
- Died: 24 October 1892 (aged 68); Melbourne, Australia

Domestic team information
- Years: Team
- 1858: Victoria
- Source: Cricinfo, 2 May 2015

Henry Creswick (13 April 1824 – 24 October 1892) was an Australian pastoralist, businessman and sportsman. He played two first-class cricket matches for Victoria in 1858.

== Business and pastoral career ==
Henry Creswick was born on 13 April 1824 in Sheffield, England. He arrived in the Port Phillip District in 1840 and joined the firm of Melbourne merchants Campbell and Woolley, opening their Ballarat branch at Anderson's Flat the following year. In 1842 he and his brothers Charles and John took up the pastoral run of Creswick Creek for which the town of Creswick is named, first surveyed in 1854. After Charles died in 1847 Henry Creswick paused his pastoral career. From 1851 to 1858 he was a partner in D.S. Campbell & Co. running a liquor store on Collins Street. He earned a great profit and became known for his expertise, joining the Australian Wine Judges' Association and judging wines at the Royal Show. The two partners bought allotments in many of the new towns; Creswick owned properties as far as the Royal Hotel in Deniliquin, New South Wales.

After serving on the Victorian Legislative Assembly Creswick resumed his pastoral career and in 1873 bought Liewah, a station on Balranald Road in New South Wales. His son was taken away from the University of Melbourne to manage it, much to his annoyance. Creswick was one of the first squatters in the Mallee

== Parliamentary career ==
Creswick retired from business two years after being appointed a magistrate in 1856. He was elected as Member of the Victorian Legislative Assembly for Emerald Hill in 1863 but he did not like political conflict and did not seek reelection.

== Personal life ==
In 1849 Creswick married Jane, the only child of Alexander Thomson. Their son Alexander Thomson Creswick was born on 28 July 1853 at The Hawthorns and later became a pastoralist and racehorse owner.

Creswick died on 24 October 1892 in Hawthorn, Victoria. His remains were interred at Boroondara General Cemetery the following day.

== See also ==
- List of Victoria first-class cricketers
