= National Citizens' Reform League =

- Historic leaders: William Irvine; Thomas Bent
- Founded: 1902; 123 years ago
- Dissolved: c.1904; 121 years ago
- Succeeded by: United Liberal Party
- Ideology: Small government Anti-socialism; Conservatism
- Political position: Centre-right

The National Citizens' Reform League, sometimes known as the Kyabram movement, was formed in Melbourne in April 1902. It sought to reduce the size of the Victorian government, following the recent creation of the Australian Government. Its cause attracted those opposed to the Australian Labor Party and the Alexander Peacock led group of Liberal Party supporters. Within one month it had 90 branches.

Its leader, William Irvine, soon replaced Premier Peacock in June and went on to win the 1902 Victorian state election in October.

Within six months of its founding, the League had over 15,000 members.

The League's cause was greatly progressed by the passing of the Constitution Act 1903 (also known as the "Constitution Reform Act"). Its changes included reducing the number of seats in the Victorian Legislative Assembly from 95 to 67, and those in the Legislative Council from 48 to 35.

Irvine retired from the role of Premier in February 1904, being replaced by the similarly minded Thomas Bent. He contested the 1904 Victorian state election in June and was successful.

In July 1904, the Catholic newspaper The Advocate reported that "The National Citizens' Reform League had its birth in Kyabram. It exercised a great influence in its brief day, but to-day it is, for most practical purposes, as dead as Julius Caesar." Branches of the group held fundraising events in July and August that year.

Premier Bent's supporters in parliament became known as the "Ministerial Liberal Party". The Peacock group of liberal MPs came to be led by Donald Mackinnon. The two groups merged to form a united Liberal Party in mid-February 1907 in the leadup to the 1907 Victorian state election in March. This new party was a clear replacement for the League.

In May 1907, Table Talk reported that the League had ultimately been unsuccessful: "Five years ago, amid a flourish of-trumpets, citizens reform leagues were formed to sweep away the abominable spendthrift practices of State legislatures. It has all ended in smoke." An August 1907 article in the Punch of Melbourne noted that while its philosophy lived on, the National Citizen's Reform League had not.
