= 1902 Victorian state election =

All 95 seats in the Victorian Legislative Assembly 48 seats needed for a majority
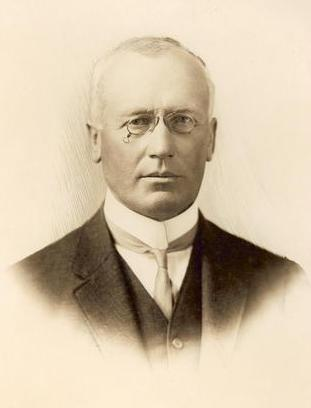

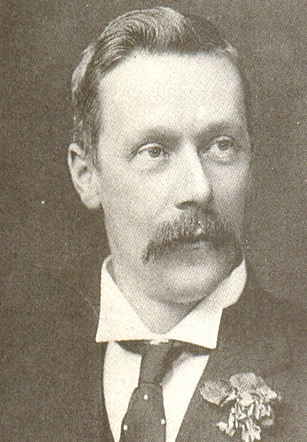
	First party	Second party
Leader	William Irvine	Alexander Peacock
Party	National Citizens' Reform League	Liberal
Leader's seat	Lowan	Clunes and Allandale
Seats won	47 seats	15 seats
Premier before election
William Irvine
National Citizens' Reform League
Elected Premier
William Irvine
National Citizens' Reform League

The 1902 Victorian state election was held in the Australian state of Victoria on 1 October 1902, to elect 70 of the 95 members of the Victorian Legislative Assembly. The other 25 seats were uncontested.

There was manhood suffrage in single and multimember districts (with multiple voting), and first past the post (plurality) voting was used.

William Irvine replaced Alexander Peacock as Victorian Premier on 10 June 1902, and contested the election as the incumbent premier and leader of the conservative National Citizens' Reform League. Irvine soundly defeated the Liberals, and their Labor allies led by Frederick Bromley.

This election marked the end of traditional contests between the Liberals and Conservatives in Victoria, with the Reform League made up of members from both parties.

This was also the first election in Victoria after federation in 1901, when it ceased to be a colony and became a state.

== Results ==
47 Ministerialist MPs were elected with the backing of the Citizens' Reform League, while 11 ran solely as Ministerialists or Independent Ministerialists. Liberal MPs were elected as Oppositionists.

Legislative Assembly (FPTP)
Party	Votes	%	Swing	Seats	Change
Reform League Ministerialists	71,951	42.07		47	
Liberal Oppositionists	30,929	18.09	−32.52	15	▼29
Labour	30,804	18.01	+6.73	12	▲3
Independent Ministerialists	22,997	13.45		7	
Ministerialists	9,028	5.28		11	
Independent Labour	3,202	1.87		2	
Reform League	2,104	1.23		1	▲1
Formal votes	171,015	99.65			
Informal votes	606	0.35			
Total	171,621			95	
Registered voters / turnout	290,241	65.41			

== See also ==
- Members of the Victorian Legislative Assembly, 1902–1904
