= Electoral district for Railway Officers =

Former state electoral district of Victoria, Australia

Railway Officers Victoria—Legislative Assembly
- State: Victoria
- Created: 1904
- Abolished: 1907

The Electoral district of Railway Officers was an electoral district of the Victorian Legislative Assembly. The 1903 Constitution Act reserved two seats in the Legislative Assembly to be elected by and from Railway Officers and similarly one seat for Public Officers, and one seat in the Legislative Council for both groups combined. In 1907, these four seats were abolished and such officers voted instead in their electoral district and province and were otherwise prohibited from political campaigning.

== Members of Railway Officers ==
Member 1	Party	Term	Member 2	Party	Term
Martin Hannah	Labour	1904–1906 ^{[r]}	Robert Solly	Labour	1904–1906 ^{[r]}

^{[r]} = resigned in November 1906

== See also ==
- Parliaments of the Australian states and territories
- List of members of the Victorian Legislative Assembly
