= Robert Stanley (Australian politician) =

Member of the Victorian Parliament for Horsam
- In office 1 November 1900 – 1 May 1904
- Preceded by: James Hugh Brake
- Succeeded by: District abolished

Member of the Victorian Parliament for Lowan
- In office 1 July 1906 – 16 November 1911
- Preceded by: Sir William Irvine
- Succeeded by: James Menzies

Personal details
- Born: c.1847 County Tipperary, Ireland
- Died: 23 August 1918 (aged 73) Northcote, Victoria
- Resting place: Heidelberg Cemetery
- Party: Commonwealth Liberal Party
- Spouse: Mary Jane Strudwick
- Children: 5 sons, 4 daughters
- Parent(s): Thomas and Martha Stanley
- Occupation: Miner, Farmer

Robert Stanley (c. 1847 – 23 August 1918) was an Australian politician representing the electoral districts of Horsham and Lowan in the Victorian Legislative Assembly for the Commonwealth Liberal Party.

== Biography ==
Stanley arrived in Australia c. 1867. He was a miner at Ballarat, Victoria and in South Australia. He was a Shire Councillor on Shire of Wimmera from 1890 to 1906 and served as Shire President from 1891 till 1892 and again whilst in between electoral districts from 1905 until 1906.

Stanley was married to Mary Jane Stanley (nee Strudwick) and fathered 5 sons and 4 daughters. He died in the Melbourne suburb of Northcote and was interred at Heidelberg Cemetery.

Victorian Legislative Assembly
Preceded by James Hugh Brake	Member for Horsham; 1900–1904	District abolished
Preceded by Sir William Irvine	Member for Lowan; 1906–1911	Succeeded by James Menzies
