= Electoral district for Public Officers =

Former state electoral district of Victoria, Australia

Public Officers Victoria—Legislative Assembly
- State: Victoria
- Created: 1904
- Abolished: 1907

The Electoral district of Public Officers was an electoral district of the Victorian Legislative Assembly. The 1903 Constitution Act reserved one seat in the Legislative Assembly to be elected by and from Public Officers and similarly two seats for Railway Officers, and one seat in the Legislative Council for both groups combined. In 1907, these four seats were abolished and such officers voted instead in their electoral district and province and were otherwise prohibited from political campaigning.

== Members of Public Officers ==
Member	Party	Term
David Gaunson	Labour	Jun 1904 – Dec 1906
John Carter	Independent	Feb 1907 – Feb 1907

== See also ==
- Parliaments of the Australian states and territories
- List of members of the Victorian Legislative Assembly
