= Robert Solly =

Australian politician

Robert Henry Solly (9 September 1859 – 5 June 1932) was an Australian politician.

Born in Ramsgate, Kent, to Stephen Solly and Eliza Sage, he received no formal education and worked on a farm and a rope factory. At the age of ten he moved to Newcastle to work in the boot trade, and emigrated to South Australia when he was seventeen. After a year in Adelaide he travelled to New South Wales via Victoria, where he worked as a station hand. After another five-year stint in Adelaide (during which time, in 1873, he married Adelaide Mary Graham, with whom he had four children), he moved to Collingwood in Melbourne and returned to bootmaking, becoming president of the Bootmakers Union.

A founding member of the Labor Party, Solly was a Richmond City Councillor from 1903 to 1909. In 1904 he was elected to the Victorian Legislative Assembly as the Labor member for Railway Officers, resigning in 1906 to run for the House of Representatives. Having been unsuccessful, he returned to the Assembly via a by-election for the seat of Carlton and served until his death at Carlton in 1932.

Victorian Legislative Assembly
District created	Member for Railway Officers; 1904–1906; Served alongside: Martin Hannah	District abolished
Preceded by Frederick Bromley	Member for Carlton; 1908–1932	Succeeded by Bill Barry
