= Frederick Bromley =

Australian politician

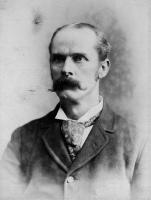

Leader of the Labour Party in Victoria Elections: 1902, 1904
- In office 3 December 1900 – 7 June 1904
- Preceded by: William Trenwith
- Succeeded by: George Prendergast

Member of the Victorian Legislative Assembly for Carlton
- In office 20 April 1892 – 29 September 1908
- Preceded by: John Gardiner
- Succeeded by: Robert Solly

Personal details
- Born: Frederick Hadkinson Bromley; 30 November 1854 Wolverhampton, Staffordshire, England
- Died: 29 September 1908 (aged 53) Carlton, Victoria, Australia
- Party: United Labour Party
- Spouse: Rosina Brown (m. 1879)
- Occupation: Decorative artist and trade unionist

Frederick Hadkinson Bromley (30 November 1854 – 29 September 1908) was an English-born Australian trade unionist and early Labour leader in Victoria.

== Early life ==
Bromley was born in 1854 in Wolverhampton, England. He trained as an artist at the School of Design in South Kensington, and became an artist specialising in japanning, a European imitation of Asian lacquerwork.

== Artistic career and trade union activity ==
In 1879, Bromley migrated to Victoria, where he lived in Carlton and worked as a japanner for the tin-making firm of Hughes & Harvey. In the early 1880s, Bromley became active with the trade union movement, co-founding the Melbourne Tinsmiths, Iron-workers and Japanners' Society and serving as its first secretary. Hughes & Harvey refused to accept the industry's eight-hour day reforms and dismissed Bromley for his advocacy, whereupon he became a freelance decorative artist and union organiser—combining his occupations by painting trade union banners.

In May 1883, Bromley joined the Victorian Trades Hall Council, representing the tinsmiths' union. He was elected vice-president of the council in 1884, and president in March 1885.

== Political career ==
In March 1886, Bromley contested the electoral district of Collingwood, but was unsuccessful. He joined the Progressive Political League, and was elected vice-president in December 1891. At the 1892 election, the PPL nominated Bromley as its candidate for Carlton, and he was duly elected in April 1892. He became the first secretary of the party, which had gone through several iterations and emerged as the United Labour Party in May 1896. Bromley served as the party's first secretary until he was elected party leader on 3 December 1900 after William Trenwith resigned as Labour leader to take up an appointment as Commissioner of Public Works and Minister of Railways in George Turner's Cabinet.

In 1893, Bromley sued Maurice Brodzky, the proprietor and publisher of the weekly newspaper Table Talk, for libel after Brodzky compared the "feline portion of the Labour party" to the thievish disposition of a cat towards fish—a metaphor which Bromley took as a reference to his support of George Sangster over the latter's unauthorised use of union funds. The jury found in Bromley's favour and awarded him £500 damages, leading to the collapse of a respected newspaper and Brodzky leaving for America.

Bromley led Labour at the 1904 Victorian state election on 1 June 1904, but resigned as leader six days after the election due to ill health, and George Prendergast replaced him. He died in office on 29 September 1908, at the age of 53.

Victorian Legislative Assembly
Preceded by John Gardiner	Member for Carlton; 1892–1908	Succeeded by Robert Solly
Party political offices
Preceded by William Trenwith	Leader of the Labour Party in Victoria; 1900–1904	Succeeded by George Prendergast
