= William Irvine (Australian politician) =

Australian politician and judge (1858–1943)

The Honourable Sir William Irvine GCMG
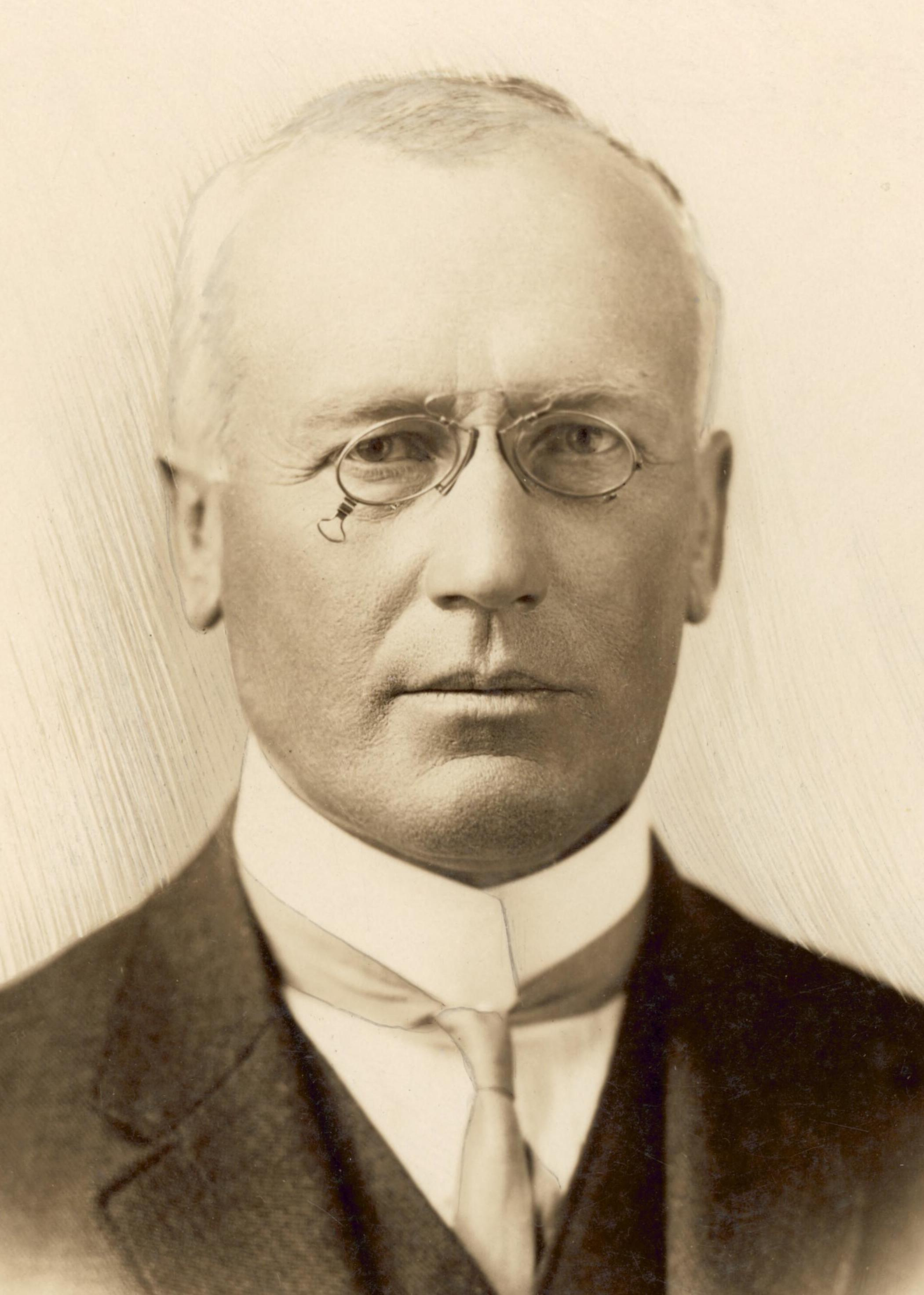

Chief Justice of Victoria
- In office 9 April 1918 – 30 September 1935
- Preceded by: John Madden
- Succeeded by: Frederick Mann

Attorney-General of Australia
- In office 24 June 1913 – 17 September 1914
- Prime Minister: Joseph Cook
- Preceded by: Billy Hughes
- Succeeded by: Billy Hughes

Premier of Victoria
- In office 10 June 1902 – 16 February 1904
- Governor: George Clarke; Reginald Talbot
- Preceded by: Alexander Peacock
- Succeeded by: Thomas Bent

Member of the Australian Parliament for Division of Flinders
- In office 12 December 1906 – 5 April 1918
- Preceded by: James Gibb
- Succeeded by: Stanley Bruce

Personal details
- Born: 6 July 1858 Newry, County Down, Ireland
- Died: 20 August 1943 (aged 85) Toorak, Victoria, Australia
- Party: Anti-Socialist (to 1909); Liberal (1909–1917); Nationalist (1917)
- Other political affiliations: National Citizens' Reform League
- Spouse: Agnes Wanliss (m. 1891)
- Relations: John Mitchel (uncle)
- Education: Trinity College, Dublin; University of Melbourne.
- Profession: Barrister

Sir William Hill Irvine GCMG (6 July 1858 – 20 August 1943) was an Australian politician and judge. He served as Premier of Victoria (1902–1904), Attorney-General of Australia (1913–1914), and Chief Justice of Victoria (1918–1935).

Irvine was born in County Down, Ireland. He was educated at Trinity College, Dublin, and the University of Melbourne, immigrating to Australia in 1879. He qualified as a barrister and was first elected to the Victorian Legislative Assembly in 1894. Appointed attorney-general of Victoria in 1899, Irvine succeeded Alexander Peacock as premier in 1902 with the backing of the National Citizens' Reform League and retained office after the 1902 state election. He carried out democratic reforms but attracted the enmity of the labour movement for his suppression of a railway strike in 1903, resigning as premier in 1904.

At the 1906 federal election, Irvine was elected to the seat of Flinders. He served as attorney-general in the Liberal government of Joseph Cook from 1913 to 1914, and during World War I was an advocate of conscription and leading campaigner in the 1916 referendum on overseas conscription. Irvine resigned from federal parliament in 1918 to become chief justice of Victoria. He served on the court until 1935 and as lieutenant-governor also served as acting governor of Victoria for nearly three years during the Great Depression.

== Early life ==
Irvine was born on 6 July 1858 at Dromalane near Newry in County Down, Ireland (present-day Northern Ireland). He was the sixth of seven children born to Margaret (née Mitchel) and Hill Irvine. His father was a farmer and proprietor of a linen mill, while his uncle John Mitchel was a prominent Irish nationalist.

Irvine was raised in a Presbyterian family. He was educated at the Royal School, Armagh and Trinity College, Dublin, graduating Bachelor of Arts in 1879. He subsequently entered the King's Inns with the intent of qualifying as a barrister, but the death of his father and financial difficulties led him to instead immigrate to Australia.

After arriving in Australia, Irvine settled in Melbourne and undertook further studies at the University of Melbourne, graduating Master of Arts in 1882, Bachelor of Laws in 1884, and Master of Laws in 1886. He read law with Henry Hodges and was admitted to the Victorian Bar in 1884. Irvine struggled in his first years as a barrister, supplementing his income with work as an examiner at the law school and the authoring of textbooks on the powers of justices of the peace and women's property (co-authored with Frank Gavan Duffy). He also speculated unsuccessfully on gold mining ventures.

== Victorian politics ==
In 1894, Irvine was elected to the Victorian Legislative Assembly as a Liberal. He was Attorney-General 1899–1900 and 1902–03, and Solicitor-General in 1903. He succeeded George Turner as leader of the Victorian Liberals, but was much more conservative than either Turner or the federal Protectionist Party leader, Alfred Deakin. In 1902, supported by the National Citizens' Reform League, he displaced the more liberal Alexander Peacock and became Premier and Treasurer. He held office until 1904, when he was succeeded by the similarly-minded Thomas Bent.

Irvine's ministry was appointed on 10 June 1902:

- Premier and Attorney-General : William Irvine
- Treasurer : William Shiels
- Solicitor-General : John Mark Davies
- Minister of Railways : Thomas Bent
- Minister of Education and Health : Robert Reid
- Minister of Public Works and Agriculture : John Taverner
- President of Board of Lands : Malcolm McKenzie
- Minister of Mines : Ewen Cameron
- Chief Secretary and Minister of Labour : John Murray

A major event in Irvine's term as premier was the 1903 Victorian railway strike. In line with the small government principles of the Reform League, he had introduced retrenchments across the public service which had a particular impact on Victorian Railways workers. In May 1903, engine-drivers launched a strike in protest of the retrenchments and poor working conditions. Irvine launched a "swift and crushing" response, including the dismissal of strike leaders, forfeiture of accrued benefits, and the employment of strikebreakers. He ended the strike within a week, but his actions resulted in the lasting enmity of the labour movement.

== Federal politics ==
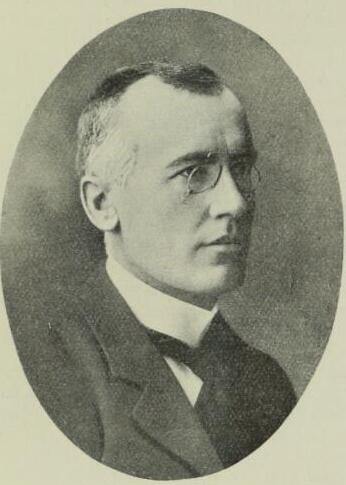
Irvine in 1907

Irvine was elected to the House of Representatives at the 1906 federal election, winning the seat of Flinders as an Anti-Socialist. He joined the "corner group" in parliament and clashed with Protectionist leader Alfred Deakin and Australian Labor Party frontbencher Billy Hughes on a number of occasions. Following the fusion of the Anti-Socialists and Protectionists into a new Liberal Party in 1909, Irvine was considered for inclusion in the third Deakin ministry. His name was put forward by Joseph Cook, but he was vetoed by John Forrest and James Hume Cook was also strongly opposed to his presence. It has been suggested that his association with the railway strike prevented his elevation to cabinet, despite his status as a former premier.

After Deakin's resignation as Liberal leader in 1913, Irvine stood as his successor but was eliminated on the first ballot, behind Cook and Forrest. He was appointed Attorney-General in the Cook government after the party's victory at the 1913 federal election. In September 1913 he survived a censure motion by only a single vote on party lines, following accusations that he had failed to deal with a conflict of interest by continuing to represent private clients while serving as attorney-general.

Irvine's term as attorney-general ended after the Cook government's defeat at the 1914 election, the first double dissolution. In opposition he was an advocate for universal conscription and the use of conscripts for overseas military service. He was a leading campaigner for the "Yes" vote at the 1916 plebiscite on overseas conscription. Following the Australian Labor Party split of 1916, Irvine supported the formation of a new "win-the-war party", which became the Nationalist Party under former ALP leader Billy Hughes. Despite another plebiscite vote against overseas conscription in 1917, he believed parliament should nonetheless legislate the proposal that had been defeated and "refused to join any ministry which was unprepared to legislate for conscription"

== Judicial career ==
Irvine retired from politics in March 1918 to accept appointment as chief justice of Victoria, following the death of John Madden. He was sworn in as chief justice on 9 April 1918.

According to the Australian Dictionary of Biography, Irvine was not viewed as an outstanding jurist. Although he was "clear and expeditious in his decisions", he deferred to legal precedent and was not an original thinker. Robert Menzies, who argued several cases before Irvine early in his career, described him as a "first-class trial judge, dignified, upright, cold in manner […] but perceptive, and devoted to justice", while Arthur Dean stated he "presided over his court with great dignity and decorum, but with some degree of detachment from the case before him, particularly in the dangerous hours after lunch".

Irvine remained in office as chief justice until his resignation on 30 September 1935, aged 77. He was seen as having stayed in office too long and had to be convinced by a fellow judge to resign. Irvine had been appointed lieutenant-governor of Victoria in 1919, an office typically held by the chief justice. He was administrator of the government on several occasions, notably as acting governor for three years from 1931 to 1934 when the state government chose to leave the office vacant to avoid additional expenditure during the Great Depression.

== Personal life ==
In 1891, Irvine married Agnes Somerville Wanliss, the daughter of colonial MP Thomas Wanliss, with whom he had three children. He died in Toorak on 20 August 1943, aged 85, after suffering a "progressively disabling disease that restricted movement and speech". He was granted a state funeral.

Irvine was nicknamed "Iceberg" for his apparently frosty and reserved demeanour. He was seen as "cold and aloof" by some colleagues, although as acting governor he and his wife were apparently popular among the general public where he became known for his "resonant and rich speaking voice". According to the Dictionary of Irish Biography, he was "eccentric in his private habits, and often suffering from debilitating neuroses, he would go sculling and bush-walking to stave off his personal crises".

Irvine was knighted KCMG in 1914 and made GCMG in 1936. A keen motorist, he was a founding member of the Royal Automobile Club of Victoria (RACV) and was its patron from 1938 through 1943. In 1932 a painting of Irvine by Ernest Buckmaster won the Archibald Prize, Australia's best-known portrait prize.

A significant collection of papers relating to Irvine and his family, including his Irish nationalist uncle John Mitchel, were donated to the State Library of Victoria in 2008.

== See also ==
- List of Judges of the Supreme Court of Victoria

== Sources ==
- Geoff Browne, A Biographical Register of the Victorian Parliament, 1900–84, Government Printer, Melbourne, 1985
- Don Garden, Victoria: A History, Thomas Nelson, Melbourne, 1984
- Kathleen Thompson and Geoffrey Serle, A Biographical Register of the Victorian Parliament, 1856–1900, Australian National University Press, Canberra, 1972
- Raymond Wright, A People's Counsel. A History of the Parliament of Victoria, 1856–1990, Oxford University Press, Melbourne, 1992

Victorian Legislative Assembly
Preceded by Richard Baker	Member for Lowan; 1894–1906	Succeeded by Robert Stanley
Preceded by Isaac Isaacs	Attorney-General of Victoria; 1899–1900	Succeeded by Isaac Isaacs
Preceded by Alexander Peacock	Premier of Victoria; 1902–1904	Succeeded by Thomas Bent
Preceded by Sir Samuel Gillott as Attorney-General	Attorney-General of Victoria; 1902-1903; Solicitor-General of Victoria; Feb - Sep 1903	Succeeded by John Davies
Preceded by John Davies as Solicitor-General	Attorney-General of Victoria; 1902-1903; Solicitor-General of Victoria; Feb - Sep 1903	Succeeded by John Davies
Parliament of Australia
Preceded by James Gibb	Member for Flinders; 1906–1918	Succeeded by Stanley Bruce
Preceded by Billy Hughes	Attorney-General of Australia; 1913–1914	Succeeded by Billy Hughes
Government offices
Preceded by John Madden	Lieutenant-Governor of Victoria; 1918–1936	Succeeded by Frederick Mann
Legal offices
Preceded by John Madden	Chief Justice of Victoria; 1918–1935	Succeeded by Frederick Mann
