= Electoral district of Carlton =

Former state electoral district of Victoria, Australia

Carlton Victoria—Legislative Assembly
- State: Victoria
- Created: 1877
- Abolished: 1958
- Demographic: Metropolitan
- Coordinates: 37°47′30″S 144°58′0″E

Carlton was an electoral district of the Legislative Assembly in the Australian state of Victoria located in the inner-Melbourne suburb of Carlton from 1877 to 1958.

The district was defined as:

Commencing at a point in the centre of Nicholson street in line with the centre of Faraday street; thence west by a line passing through the centre of Faraday street to Madeline street; thence north by a line passing through the centre of Madeline street and north-westerly westerly and south-westerly by a line passing through the centre of College Crescent to the Sydney road; thence north by a line passing through the centre of the Sydney road to Park street Brunswick; thence east by a line passing through the centre of Park street east to Nicholson street; and thence south by a line passing through the centre of Nicholson street to the commencing point.

== Members for Carlton ==
Member	Party	Term
James Munro	Unaligned	1877–1880
John Gardiner	Unaligned	1880–1892
Frederick Bromley	Labour	1892–1908
Robert Solly	Labor	1908–1932
Bill Barry	Labor	1932–1955
Bill Barry	Labor (Anti-Communist)	1955
Denis Lovegrove	Labor	1955–1958
