= Victorian Labor Party =

Affiliate of the Labor Party in Victoria

Victorian Labor Party Australian Labor Party (Victorian Branch)
- Leader: Ben Carroll
- Deputy Leader: Gabrielle Williams
- President: Uros Rasic
- Secretary: Steve Staikos
- Founded: 1891; 135 years ago
- Headquarters: 438 Docklands Drive, Docklands, Melbourne, Victoria
- Youth wing: Young Labor
- Women's wing: Labor Women's Network
- LGBT wing: Rainbow Labor
- Membership: ▲ <16,000
- Ideology: Social democracy
- Political position: Centre-left
- National affiliation: Australian Labor
- Colours: Red
- Slogan: Fighting for Working People.
- Legislative Assembly: 54 / 88
- Legislative Council: 15 / 40
- House of Representatives: 25 / 39 (Victorian seats)
- Senate: 4 / 12 (Victorian seats)
- Local government: 20 / 656

Website
- viclabor.org.au

Seats in local government
- Darebin: 5 / 9
- Melbourne: 1 / 11
- Merri-bek: 3 / 11
- Moonee Valley: 4 / 9
- Port Phillip: 2 / 9
- Whittlesea: 4 / 11
- Yarra: 1 / 9

The Victorian Labor Party, officially the Australian Labor Party (Victorian Branch), is the affiliate of the Australian Labor Party (ALP) in the Australian state of Victoria and is the major progressive centre-left political party in Victorian politics. The party is the oldest continuously active political party in the states history and the most electorally successful contemporary party in Victoria having won nine of the last fourteen state elections since 1982. Ben Carroll has served as the 19th state parliamentary leader since 2026 and Steve Staikos as the 25th party state secretary since 2024.

Victorian Labor comprises two major wings: the parliamentary wing and the organisational wing. The parliamentary wing (formally referred to as the State Parliamentary Labor Party) comprises all elected party members in the Legislative Assembly and Legislative Council, which when they meet collectively constitute the party caucus. The parliamentary leader is elected from and by the caucus, and party factions have a strong influence in the election of the leader. The leader's position is dependent on the continuing support of the caucus, and the leader may be deposed by failing to win a vote of confidence of parliamentary members. By convention, the Premier sits in the Legislative Assembly, and is the leader of the party controlling a majority in that house. The party leader also typically is a member of the Assembly, though this is not a strict party constitutional requirement.

When Victorian Labor wins sufficient seats to be able to control a majority in the Legislative Assembly, the party leader becomes the State Premier and Labor will form the Government of Victoria. When the party is not in government, the party leader becomes the Leader of the Opposition. To become a Premier or Opposition Leader, the party leader must be or within a short period of time become a member of the Legislative Assembly.

At the 2014 state election, Victorian Labor obtained a majority with 47 of the 88 seats in the Legislative Assembly and formed government. The party then increased its share of seats in the Assembly to 55 after the 2018 election. The party currently holds 15 of the 40 seats in the Legislative Council. Since 28 July 2026, the leader and deputy leader of Victorian Labor have been Ben Carroll and Gabrielle Williams, respectively.

== History ==
=== Formative years ===
While struggling to balance an uneasy alliance of trade unionists and progressive social reformers during the 1890s, the political labor movement in Victoria underwent several changes of name. It was called the Progressive Political League between 1891 and 1894, the United Labor and Liberal Party of Victoria from June 1894, the United Labor Party from 1896 and the Political Labor Council of Victoria from 1901; before becoming the Victorian Branch of the Australian Labor Party.

Labor members were first elected to the Victorian Legislative Assembly in 1894, but the actual numbers are uncertain. They stood as part of the United Labor and Liberal Party, formed in 1894 to replace the Progressive Political League, which won 18 of the 95 seats. At the 1897 election Labor candidates stood as the United Labor Party and won 8 of the 95 seats, all of which had to be contested. Its representation went to 9 of the 95 seats at the 1900 election. Labor candidates contested the 1902 election as the Political Labor Council of Victoria and won 12 of the 95 seats.

=== George Prendergast and George Elmslie ===
At the 1904 election Labor won 17 of the 67 seats, becoming the second largest party in the Assembly, and became the Opposition. George Prendergast took over as leader of the parliamentary Labor party from Frederick Bromley after Bromley had resigned due to ill health six days after the election. At the 1907 election it slipped to 14 of 65 seats; and increased to 21 of 65 seats at the 1908 election. At the 1911 election Labor won 20 of the 65 seats, to 43 for the various factions of the Liberal Party. Prendergast resigned the leadership because of ill-health in 1913, to be succeeded by George Elmslie, who had been elected to the Victorian Legislative Assembly in 1902 and became deputy leader in 1912.

In December 1913, the Liberal Premier, William Watt, resigned after a dispute with the rural faction of his own party. The acting Governor, John Madden, surprised the Liberals by sending for Elmslie, who on 9 December formed Victoria's first Labor government. Elmslie's tenure as Premier lasted only 14 days, by which time the Liberal factions re-united, and Watt moved a no-confidence motion in Elmslie and resumed office on 22 December. Watt resigned in June 1914 to enter federal politics, and Alexander Peacock returned to leadership. The 1914 election was fought after World War I was declared, and Labor increased its seats to 22, while the Liberals retained 43.

The 1916 Labor split occurred over the issue of World War I conscription in Australia which saw pro-conscription Labor members expelled from the party and running as National Labor candidates at the 1917 election. That election also saw the emergence of the Victorian Farmers' Union (the forerunner of the Country Party) as a party. There was also a split in the Nationalist party into rural and city factions and both factions fielded their own candidates. However, Victoria introduced compulsory preferential voting before this election, and most of the preferences resulting from multiple Nationalist candidates were kept within the party. At that election, of the 65 seats, the pro-Ministerial city faction of the Nationalists won 13 seats, while the rural faction won 27. Labor won 18 seats, National Labor won 3 and the VFU won 4. After the election the rural Nationalist faction took control of the party, ousting Premier Alexander Peacock. The Nationalists reunited under Bowser. Elmslie died in 1918 and Prendergast returned to the party's leadership. At the 1920 election Labor won 20 seats to the Nationalists' 30. VFU became a force, holding the balance of power in the Legislative Assembly with 13 seats, a position it held until 1952. In 1920, it supported the conservative Nationalist government. In 1921, the VFU voted with Labor against the Nationalist government when it abolished the compulsory wheat pool operating in the state, leading to a dissolution of Parliament and the 1921 election, which maintained the same balance of power.

In April 1924, the VFU, now called the Country Party, again withdrew its support from the Nationalist government when it tried to legislate a reduction in the rural over-representation. Peacock, back in government, called the 1924 election in June, at which Labor won 27 seats, the Nationalists 20 and the Country Party 13. The Country Party supported the minority Labor government in exchange for a number of policy concessions. Prendergast became Premier at the age of 70 – the oldest man ever to take the office for the first time. The only real talents in his government were Edmond Hogan as Minister for Agriculture and Railways and William Slater as Attorney-General. John Cain was an Assistant Minister. The Prendergast government was the first Labor government in Victoria able actually to govern. Immediate action was taken to provide shelter for unemployed Victorians, while the government set up royal commissions into the causes of a major police strike in 1923, the prices of bread and flour, and the soldier settlement scheme. Increased expenditure was made available for rural roads, while reductions were made on rail freights and fares. With the support of the Country Party, he was able to pass several bills assisting farmers, but the Country Party would not support anything which benefited Labor's urban working-class base. This was a frustrating situation for Labor ministers, and several urged Prendergast to call another election in the hope of improving their position, but Prendergast was too timid to run the risk. In November the Country Party patched up its differences with the Nationalists, and the two parties joined forces to defeat Prendergast in the Assembly. The Country Party leader, John Allan, succeeded him as Premier.

Labor in Victoria in the early federal period was much weaker than in the other states, and there had never been a majority Labor state government. This was partly due to the continuing attraction of Deakinite liberalism among middle-class voters in Melbourne, partly because Victoria did not have the huge pastoral and mining areas that the other mainland states had. The Parliamentary Labor Party remained small and contained limited talent. Victoria was Labor's weakest state throughout the 1920s, due to the gross over-representation of rural areas in the Legislative Assembly, and the strength of the Country Party in rural areas and the Nationalist Party in middle-class Melbourne seats. Labor's parliamentary representation was confined to the industrial areas of Melbourne and a few provincial towns. There was little talent in the Parliamentary Labor Party and few regarded Prendergast as likely ever to win a state election. Most notably, however, the lack of a Labor majority government was due to the high degree of rural over-representation existing in the state's electoral system, which strongly favoured rural electorates to the disadvantage of inner-city electorates, where Labor's vote was concentrated.

=== Edmond Hogan ===
Hogan had been elected to the Victorian Legislative Assembly in 1913. His was not a natural Labor seat, but it was heavily Irish-Catholic, which helped Hogan, an active Catholic, retain it. In 1914 he was elected to the Labor Party's state executive and in 1922 he became State President. Prendergast resigned as Labor leader in 1926 and was succeeded by Hogan.

Hogan was a fine speaker and soon became a leading figure in a parliamentary party which was thin on talent. Victoria was Labor's weakest state and in the 1920s there seemed little chance it would ever win a state election. When Prendergast stepped down in 1926, Hogan was the obvious choice to succeed him. His main drawback was his close association with the Melbourne horse-racing, boxing and gambling identity John Wren, who was widely suspected of corruption. The Wren connection alienated many middle-class voters from Labor through the 1920s and 1930s.

Nevertheless, at the 1927 election Hogan was able to capitalise on resentment against rural over-representation in the state Parliament and consequent domination by the Country Party. Labor won 28 seats to the Nationalists 15 and the Country Party's ten. Hogan was able to form a minority government with the support of the four Country Progressive Party and two Liberal members. But this alliance broke down in 1928 in the face a prolonged and violent industrial dispute on the Melbourne waterfront, and in November he was defeated in a confidence vote and resigned, being succeeded by the Nationalist William McPherson with the support of the Country Party.

In 1929 the Country Party withdrew its support from the McPherson government, resulting in the 1929 election, fought just as the Great Depression was breaking over Australia. Hogan led Labor to its best result yet, winning 30 seats to the Nationalists' 17 and the Country Party's 11. A collection of Country Progressives, Liberals and independents held the balance, and they agreed to support a second Hogan government. Tom Tunnecliffe was Chief Secretary, John Cain was Minister for Railways and William Slater was Attorney-General.

The Great Depression in Australia had a devastating effect on Victoria's economy and society, since the state was heavily dependent on agricultural exports, mainly wheat and wool, for its income, and these industries collapsed almost completely as demand in Britain dried up. By 1931 most Victorian farmers were bankrupt and about 25 percent of the workforce was unemployed. Hogan's government, in common with all other governments, had no solution to this disaster. Even if the Labor government was minded to attempt radical solutions, it was dependent on Country Progressive support in the Assembly, and had only six members in the Legislative Council.

Hogan adopted the orthodox economic view that governments must balance their budgets, and since the Council would not permit any increases in taxation, the only way to do this in the face of falling government revenue was to cut expenditure. This increased the burdens on the poor and unemployed, while providing no stimulus to the economy. There was little possibility of effective unemployment relief, although there were some government works to soak up unemployment, such as the Shrine of Remembrance and the Great Ocean Road.

In August 1930 Hogan attended a conference with the other Premiers and the Labor Prime Minister, James Scullin, to consider what to do. On the advice of Sir Otto Niemeyer, a senior official of the Bank of England (which controlled most of Victoria's access to credit in the City of London), they agreed to radical cuts to government spending and borrowing. This provoked a storm of protest in the Labor Party and trade unions, who regarded Scullin and Hogan as traitors.

A second conference in June 1931 produced the Premiers' Plan, which entailed further cuts in government spending, accompanied by increases in taxation on the wealthy. In the circumstances both of these measures further depressed the economy, while not satisfying either side of politics. The 1931 Labor split occurred, with a breakaway NSW Labor Party led by Jack Lang rebelled and brought down the Scullin government in November, but Hogan survived with Country Party continued support from the cross benches. In any case the Nationalists, now renamed the United Australia Party (UAP) preferred to see Hogan implement the Premiers' Plan.

In February 1932 Hogan traveled to London to talk to the banks about Victoria's desperate economic plight. While he was away Tom Tunnecliffe was acting Premier, and he was much more willing than Hogan to reject the Premiers' Plan. As a result, the Country Party withdrew its support, and in April the government was defeated in a confidence vote. Tunnecliffe replaced Hogan as Labor leader and led the Labor campaign in May 1932 election, now rejecting the Premiers' Plan completely. The Labor Party Executive expelled everyone who had supported the Premiers' Plan, including Hogan, although it did not run a candidate against him. At the elections the UAP won 31 seats to Labor's 16 and the reunited Country Party's 14. Hogan and one of his ex-ministers were elected as "Premiers' Plan Labor" candidates. UAP leader Stanley Argyle became Premier.

After sitting as an independent for four years, Hogan joined the Country Party in 1935, and formed a close relationship with the Country Party leader Albert Dunstan. The result was a renewed alliance between the Country Party and Labor, brokered by Hogan, John Wren and the Victorian Labor State President, Arthur Calwell. In April 1935 Dunstan walked out of Argyle's government, and became Premier with Labor support. Hogan became Minister for Agriculture and Mines, and held these posts through Dunstan's record term as Premier until September 1943.

=== John Cain I ===
John Cain I was assistant minister for agriculture in the short-lived minority Prendergast Labor government in 1924, a minister without portfolio in the first minority Hogan Labor government (1927–28), and minister for railways and for electrical undertakings in the second Hogan government (1929–32). When Hogan's government collapsed during the Great Depression and Hogan himself was expelled from the Labor Party, Cain became party deputy leader under Tunnecliffe. Cain succeeded Tunnecliffe as Labor leader in 1937. Under both Tunnecliffe and Cain, Labor supported the Dunstan minority Country Party government from 1935 to 1943. At the 1943 election, Labor, now led by John Cain, benefiting from the popularity of John Curtin's wartime federal government, won 22 of the 65 seats.

Dunstan resigned on 14 September 1943 and John Cain formed government, which lasted only 4 days. The conservative parties resolved their differences and Dunstan resumed office and retained it with Labor support until November 1945, when Dunstan resigned again. Cain again became premier on 21 November 1945. Labor's lower house parliamentary position was much better than it had been in 1943, since the 1945 election had given Labor 31 seats to the Country Party's 18 and the Liberals' 13, with three independents. With a majority in neither House, Cain's government was unable to pass much legislation. On 2 October 1947 the Victorian Legislative Council blocked his government's budget to show its opposition to the federal Labor government of Ben Chifley, which had announced plans to nationalise the private banks. Although this issue had nothing to do with state politics, Cain was forced to resign and call the 1947 election for 8 November, at which Labor was heavily defeated. The 1950 election gave Labor 24 seats to the Liberals' 27 and the Country Party's 13. Since the Liberals and Country Party hated each other, no stable majority government was possible, and this, together with the unpopularity of the new federal Liberal government, gave Cain his opportunity. In October 1952 the Country Party premier, John McDonald, resigned and called the 1952 election. Labor won 37 seats, the first time it had won a majority in the lower house, and Cain formed his third government.

Cain's government was hampered by the hostility of the Legislative Council (which until 1950 had been elected on a restricted property-based franchise and so always had a conservative majority), and also by tensions within his own party. During the war the Communist Party had grown greatly in strength in the trade unions which controlled and funded the Labor Party, leading a faction of anti-Communist Catholics to form within the party to fight Communist influence. (This body, known as The Movement, was organised by B. A. Santamaria and supported by the Catholic Archbishop of Melbourne, Daniel Mannix). Conflict between left and right in the Labor Party grew increasingly bitter in the Cold War atmosphere of the 1950s.

Nevertheless, the Cain government was able to pass more legislation than any previous Labor government in Victoria had done. Major reforms were carried out in the areas of workers' compensation, tenancy law, long service leave, hospitals, public transport, housing, charities and the Crimes Act. Changes included the provision on long-service leave to railway workers, increased eligibility to workers' compensation, alterations to the Shops and Factories Act and the Landlord and Tenant Act, and the introduction of legislation "to penalize rogues who resorted to fraudulent misrepresentation in soliciting corporate investment from the public."

The government had also reformed wage determination procedures and public service administration, while constructive initiatives were carried out in adult education and soil conservation. Even some reforms to the electoral system were carried through the Council, where Labor and Liberal members united to reduce the malapportionment which had given the Country Party disproportionate representation since the 1920s. In its first two years the Cain government won the approval of the Melbourne daily papers The Age, The Herald and The Argus. Nevertheless, Cain's third Government fell on 19 April 1955 when 19 expelled Labor lower house members aligned to "The Movement" "crossed the floor" against the government in a no-confidence vote.

The 1955 Labor split began in October 1954 after the federal leader, Dr H. V. Evatt, blamed Santamaria and his supporters in the Victorian Labor Party for Labor's loss of seats at the 1954 federal election. Santamaria exercised strong influence in the Cain government through "Movement" linked ministers such as Bill Barry and Frank Scully. Protestant and left-wing ministers strongly opposed the Movement faction. In December 1953 the Lands Minister, Robert Holt, resigned rather than introduce a Santamaria-influenced bill which would have promoted the settlement of Italian immigrants as small farmers in Gippsland.

In early 1955 the Labor Party's federal executive dissolved the state executive and began to expel Santamaria's supporters from the party. The Victorian branch then split between pro-Evatt and pro-Santamaria factions, and in March the pro-Evatt State Executive suspended 24 members of State Parliament suspected of being Santamaria supporters. Four ministers were forced to resign from the government. When the Parliament met on 19 April 19 expelled Labor members crossed over to vote with the Liberal and Country Party members to defeat the government. At the ensuing May 1955 election, the expelled members and others stood as the Australian Labor Party (Anti-Communist), later the Democratic Labor Party. Their strategy was to draw votes from the Labor Party and direct preferences to the Liberal Party. Labor was heavily defeated, winning only 20 seats, from the 37 at the 1952 election, to the Liberals' 34 and the Country Party's ten. Only one of the expelled Labor members was re-elected.

Cain suffered a stroke on 9 August 1957 and died, aged 75. Alfred Ernest "Ernie" Shepherd (1901–58) succeeded Cain as party leader, only to die himself little more than a year afterwards. From 1958 to 1967 Clive Stoneham was Labor and Opposition Leader. He lost the 1961, 1964 and 1967 elections to the incumbent Liberal Premier, Henry Bolte, with the electoral assistance of the Democratic Labor Party, which directed its preferences to the Liberals.

=== Clyde Holding ===
Clyde Holding became party leader in 1967. During the 1970 state election campaign, which some commentators suggested Labor could win as a result of voter fatigue with the Liberals after their 15 years in power, Holding campaigned on the new federal policy of supporting state aid to non-government schools. However, in the week before the election, the left-wing state president, George Crawford and state secretary, Bill Hartley, issued a statement saying that a Victorian Labor government would not support state aid. As a result, federal leader Gough Whitlam refused to campaign for Labor in Victoria, and Holding was forced to repudiate his own policy. With the legs cut out from under the Labor campaign, Bolte won another term, though Holding was able to pick up a six-seat swing.

This episode led directly to federal intervention in the Victorian branch of the Labor Party. In 1971 the left-wing state executive was overturned by the National Executive and allies of Whitlam, Hawke and Holding took control. The left then formed an organised faction, the Socialist Left, to agitate for socialist policies, supported by some unions.

The surge in support for federal Labor which saw Whitlam elected Prime Minister in 1972 was not reflected in Victorian state politics. Bolte retired in 1972. Hid successor, Dick Hamer, a considerably more moderate Liberal, branded himself as a reformer, and Holding was unable to get the better of him. Labor was heavily defeated at the 1973 and 1976 state elections.

Holding resigned in 1977 to enter federal politics, and Frank Wilkes became party leader. At the 1979 state election, Labor under Wilkes gained eleven seats, the party's best showing for many years, though not sufficient to form government.

=== John Cain II ===
John Cain II, son of the former Labor premier, became party leader in September 1981, and won the 1982 election, winning 49 of the 81 seats in the Legislative Assembly, forming a Labor government for the first time since 1955. In 1984 the Labor government legalised prostitution in Victoria.

At the 1985 election Labor won 47 of the 88 seats, the first time that Labor had won a second term in Victoria. It was reelected with 46 seats at the 1988 election. Cain's political support collapsed in August 1990. By this time the Labor government was in deep crisis, with some of the state's financial institutions on the brink of insolvency, the budget deficit unsustainably high and growing and the Labor Party deeply divided on how to respond to the situation.

=== Joan Kirner ===
Cain resigned and Joan Kirner was elected Labor leader, becoming the party's first female leader and Victoria's first female premier. The party hoped that the elevation of a popular woman as its new leader would improve its position, but Kirner never succeeded in gaining control of the crisis into which the state had plunged. The conservative-leaning Melbourne newspaper, the Herald Sun, reacted unfavourably to a premier from the Socialist Left, dubbing her "Mother Russia". She was lampooned alternatively as a sinister commissar and as a frumpy housewife in a polka dot dress. She seemed unfazed by the Herald Sun and gradually won some respect, though she was unable to improve significantly the government's standing.

During 1991 and 1992 Kirner took several decisions to cut government spending and raise revenue to some extent. However, her government failed to cut spending in many areas including education. Most of the Kirner government's attempts to cut spending were actively opposed by trade unions and some members of the government. The interest bill alone was $3.5 billion per year, the government sold off trains and trams and leased them back. Another decision was the sale in 1991 of the state-owned State Bank of Victoria, now on the verge of collapse, to the Commonwealth Bank.

Liberal leader Alan Brown persuaded the Nationals to contest the next election as a Coalition, the first time the two main non-Labor parties in Victoria had fought an election together since 1950, before Brown was deposed as Liberal leader by Jeff Kennett in 1991. Kirner went into 1992 knowing she faced a statutory general election, even though opinion polls had almost universally written off her government. She waited as long as she could, finally calling an election for October. Although she remained personally more popular than Kennett, it was not nearly enough to overcome the electorate's anger at her party. The Coalition's "Guilty Party" campaign did much to stoke this anger, targeting many ministers in the Kirner Government and providing examples of concerns in their portfolios. The Coalition won the election in a landslide, scoring a 19-seat swing – the second-worst defeat that a sitting government has ever suffered in Victoria. The Liberals won enough seats that they could have governed in their own right. Kirner remained Opposition Leader until March 1993 and resigned from Parliament in May 1994.

Jim Kennan was a member of parliament between 1982 and 1993, initially in the Victorian Legislative Council, and then in the Legislative Assembly and was Kirner's deputy from 1990 to 1992. He became the Leader of the Opposition after Kirner resigned in March 1993, until his shock retirement from Parliament three months later.

=== Brumby and Bracks period ===
Kennan was succeeded as leader by John Brumby, who was a member of the Legislative Council at the time. Brumby transferred to the Legislative Assembly in a by-election for Kennan's seat. The defeat of the federal Labor government in March 1996 prompted Kennett to call an early state election three weeks later. Labor led by Brumby only managed a net two-seat gain, leaving it 20 seats behind the Coalition. Brumby was replaced as Labor leader in March 1999 by Steve Bracks. To everyone's surprise, Bracks won the September 1999 election, powered by an unexpected swing against the Coalition in rural and regional Victoria. This produced a hung parliament in which four independents agreed to support a minority Labor government. Labor won the 2002 state election in a landslide, taking 62 seats out of 88 in the Legislative Assembly, also winning a slim majority in the Legislative Council. In 2002, Labor reformed the Legislative Council and brought in four-year fixed-term parliaments. Labor made inroads towards same-sex equality in Victoria. Since 2001, Victorian Labor governments have amended 60 Acts to advance same-sex equality.

Labor won a third term at the 2006 state election. Bracks resigned as party leader and Premier on 27 July 2007, and his deputy leader, John Thwaites also announced his resignation on the same day. Treasurer John Brumby was elected unopposed Labor leader on 30 July 2007 and became Premier. One notable achievement of the Brumby government was abortion law reform in 2008. It also signed contracts for the Wonthaggi desalination plant in 2009, to drought-proof the State.

At the 2010 state election Labor was narrowly defeated, winning only 43 of the 88 Legislative Assembly seats.

=== Daniel Andrews ===
Brumby resigned as party leader soon after the Labor loss at the 2010 state election, to be replaced by Daniel Andrews on 3 December 2010.

After being in Opposition for one term, Labor won the 2014 state election from the Napthine Government, winning 47 seats in the Legislative Assembly. On winning office, the Andrews government cancelled the East West Link project and initiated the Level Crossing Removal program and the Melbourne Metro Rail project. On 24 May 2016 Andrews made an official apology in parliament for gay men in Victoria punished during the time homosexuality was a crime in the state. In September 2016, the Andrews government privatized the Port of Melbourne for a term of 50 years in return for more than $9.7 billion, to be used for infrastructure improvements.

At the 2018 state election, the Andrews Government was returned for a second term with an increased majority, winning 55 seats in the Legislative Assembly, and 18 of the 40 seats in the Legislative Council.

At the 2022 state election, the Andrews Government was returned for a third term with a further increase in their majority, winning 56 seats in the Legislative Assembly, and a decreased 15 out of the 40 seats in the Legislative Council.

==== Branch-stacking allegations ====
On 14 June 2020, The Age and Nine Network released covert recordings purporting to show state minister Adem Somyurek organising branch stacking within Victorian Labor.

On 17 June 2020, former Labor Premier Steve Bracks and former federal Labor deputy leader Jenny Macklin were appointed as administrators of Victorian Labor by the party's National Executive until early 2021. This was part of a federal takeover of branch operations requested by Andrews. The pair reviewed the state party’s operations with a view toward providing detailed recommendations to tackle the issue of branch-stacking within the party. Additionally, voting rights of all members were suspended and preselection processes in Victoria were controlled at the National Executive level until 2023.

Shortly following the revelation, Independent Broad-based Anti-corruption Commission (IBAC) and Victorian Ombudsman (VO) announced a joint collaboration and investigation into branch stacking activities known as "Operation Watts". Hearings began in October 2021 and lasted for four weeks. On the first day of hearings on 11 October, Byrne admitted to branch stacking and said that state minister Luke Donnellan was also involved in branch stacking. In July 2022, IBAC and VO released their report on the branch stacking investigation. They found that there were "extensive misconduct" by Victorian Labor MPs from the Moderate Labor faction, even though branch stacking was found in all factions.

==== Preselection issues for the 2022 state and federal elections ====
As a result of National Executive taking over preselection processes in June 2020, candidates for the 2022 federal and state elections were chosen by the National Executive instead of local rank-and-file members. Nominations would be made by factional leaders of the state party. The takeover had been criticised by unions and rank-and-file members. A coalition of up to 10 unions unsuccessfully challenged the move in Victorian Supreme Court, which in October 2021, ruled it to be lawful.

== Local government ==
Labor endorses candidates for a number of local government areas (LGAs) in Victoria, and has done so since at least the 1910s. Party members can either be formally endorsed or stand as "non-endorsed, supported candidates" (otherwise referred to as Independent Labor).

== Membership ==
Like all ALP State and territory branches, the membership of the Victorian branch consists of both individual members and affiliated trade unions, who between them decide the party's policies, and elect its governing bodies. Subject to national executive oversight powers, local branches choose candidates for public office, in a process called preselection.

The members and unions elect delegates to state conferences, which decide policy, and elect the state executive, state president (an honorary position usually held for a one-year term), and a state secretary, which is a full-time professional position. There are also full-time assistant secretary and organisers. In the past the ratio of conference delegates coming from the branches and affiliated unions has varied from state to state, however under recent national reforms at least 50% of delegates at all state and territory conferences must be elected by branches.

== Leadership ==
=== Leaders (parliamentary) ===
#	Leader	Electorate	Term start	Term end	Time in office	Elections contested	Premier	Departure notes
1	William Trenwith (1846–1925)	Richmond (1889–1903)	21 April 1892 (de facto)	23 November 1900	8 years, 216 days	1892, 1894, 1897, 1900	No	Resigned to join the Turner Ministry
2	Frederick Bromley (1854–1908)	Carlton (1892–1908)	3 December 1900	7 June 1904	3 years, 187 days	1902, 1904	No	Resigned due to ill health
3	George Prendergast (1854–1937)	North Melbourne (1900–1927)	7 June 1904	17 September 1913	9 years, 102 days	1907, 1908, 1911	No	Resigned due to ill health
4	George Elmslie (1861–1918)	Albert Park (1902–1918)	17 September 1913	11 May 1918	4 years, 236 days	1914, 1917	Yes (1913)	Died in office
(3)	George Prendergast (1854–1937)	North Melbourne (1900–1927)	18 June 1918	14 April 1926	7 years, 300 days	1920, 1921, 1924	Yes (1924)	Resigned
5	Edmond Hogan (1883–1964)	Warrenheip (1913–1927)	14 April 1926	1 July 1932	6 years, 78 days	1927, 1929	Yes (1927–1928, 1929–1932)	Expelled from the Labor Party by the state executive
5	Edmond Hogan (1883–1964)	Warrenheip and Grenville (1927–1945)	14 April 1926	1 July 1932	6 years, 78 days	1927, 1929	Yes (1927–1928, 1929–1932)	Expelled from the Labor Party by the state executive
6	Tom Tunnecliffe (1869–1948)	Collingwood (1921–1947)	13 July 1932	19 October 1937	5 years, 98 days	1932, 1935, 1937	No	Resigned to become Speaker
7	John Cain Sr. (1882–1957)	Northcote (1927–1957)	19 October 1937	4 August 1957	19 years, 289 days	1940, 1943, 1945, 1947, 1950, 1952, 1955	Yes (1943, 1945–1947, 1952–1955)	Died in office
8	Ernie Shepherd (1901–1958)	Ascot Vale (1955–1958)	9 August 1957	12 September 1958	1 year, 34 days	1958	No	Died in office
8	Ernie Shepherd (1901–1958)	Footscray (1958)	9 August 1957	12 September 1958	1 year, 34 days	1958	No	Died in office
9	Clive Stoneham (1909–1992)	Midlands (1945–1970)	7 October 1958	15 May 1967	8 years, 220 days	1961, 1964, 1967	No	Resigned
10	Clyde Holding (1931–2011)	Richmond (1962–1977)	15 May 1967	29 June 1977	10 years, 45 days	1970, 1973, 1976	No	Resigned to transfer to federal politics
11	Frank Wilkes (1922–2015)	Northcote (1957–1988)	29 June 1977	9 September 1981	4 years, 72 days	1979	No	Deposed
12	John Cain Jr. (1931–2019)	Bundoora (1976–1992)	9 September 1981	7 August 1990	8 years, 332 days	1982, 1985, 1988	Yes (1982–1990)	Resigned
13	Joan Kirner (1938–2015)	Williamstown (1988–1994)	9 August 1990	22 March 1993	2 years, 225 days	1992	Yes (1990–1992)	Resigned
14	Jim Kennan (1946–2010)	Broadmeadows (1988–1993)	22 March 1993	29 June 1993	98 days	No	No	Resigned
15	John Brumby (1953–)	Broadmeadows (1993–2010)	30 June 1993	19 March 1999	5 years, 262 days	1996	No	Deposed
16	Steve Bracks (1954–)	Williamstown (1994–2007)	22 March 1999	30 July 2007	8 years, 130 days	1999, 2002, 2006	Yes (1999–2007)	Resigned
(15)	John Brumby (1953–)	Broadmeadows (1993–2010)	30 July 2007	3 December 2010	3 years, 126 days	2010	Yes (2007–2010)	Resigned
17	Daniel Andrews (1972–)	Mulgrave (2002–2023)	3 December 2010	27 September 2023	12 years, 298 days	2014, 2018, 2022	Yes (2014–2023)	Resigned
18	Jacinta Allan (1973–)	Bendigo East (1999–2026)	27 September 2023	28 July 2026	3 years, 54 days	No	Yes (2023–2026)	Deposed
19	Ben Carroll (1975–)	Niddrie (2012–)	28 July 2026	Incumbent	115 days	2026	Yes (2026–)	

=== Deputy leaders (parliamentary) ===
#	Deputy Leader	Electorate	Term start	Term end	Time in office	Deputy Premier	Leader	Departure notes
1	George Elmslie (1861–1918)	Albert Park (1902–1918)	1912	17 September 1913		No	George Prendergast	Became leader following the resignation of George Prendergast
2	John Billson (1862–1924)	Fitzroy (1900–1924)	24 September 1913	23 December 1924	11 years, 90 days	No	George Elmslie	Died in office
2	John Billson (1862–1924)	Fitzroy (1900–1924)	24 September 1913	23 December 1924	11 years, 90 days	No	George Prendergast	Died in office
3	Edmond Hogan (1883–1964)	Warrenheip (1913–1927)	18 February 1925	14 April 1926	1 year, 55 days	No	George Prendergast	Became leader following the resignation of George Prendergast
4	Tom Tunnecliffe (1869–1948)	Collingwood (1921–1947)	14 April 1926	13 July 1932	6 years, 90 days	No	Edmond Hogan	Became leader following the expulsion of Edmond Hogan
5	John Cain Sr. (1882–1957)	Northcote (1927–1957)	13 July 1932	19 October 1937	5 years, 98 days	No	Tom Tunnecliffe	Became leader following the resignation of Tom Tunnecliffe
6	Bert Cremean (1900–1945)	Clifton Hill (1934–1945)	19 October 1937	24 May 1945	7 years, 217 days	Yes (1943)	John Cain Sr.	Died in office
7	Frank Field (1904–1985)	Dandenong (1937–1947)	12 July 1945	1 December 1947	2 years, 142 days	Yes (1945–1947)	John Cain Sr.	Lost his seat of Dandenong in the 1947 state election
8	Bill Galvin (1903–1966)	Bendigo (1945–1955)	1 December 1947	14 June 1955	7 years, 195 days	Yes (1952–1955)	John Cain Sr.	Lost his seat of Bendigo in the 1955 state election
9	Ernie Shepherd (1901–1958)	Ascot Vale (1955–1958)	14 June 1955	9 August 1957	2 years, 56 days	No	John Cain Sr.	Became leader following the death of John Cain Sr.
10	Clive Stoneham (1909–1992)	Midlands (1945–1970)	9 August 1957	7 October 1958	1 year, 59 days	No	Ernie Shepherd	Became leader following the death of Ernie Shepherd
11	Denis Lovegrove (1904–1979)	Fitzroy (1958–1967)	7 October 1958	15 May 1967	8 years, 220 days	No	Clive Stoneham	Resigned
11	Denis Lovegrove (1904–1979)	Sunshine (1967–1973)	7 October 1958	15 May 1967	8 years, 220 days	No	Clive Stoneham	Resigned
12	Frank Wilkes (1922–2015)	Northcote (1957–1988)	15 May 1967	29 June 1977	10 years, 45 days	No	Clyde Holding	Became leader following the resignation of Clyde Holding
13	Robert Fordham (1942–)	Footscray (1970–1992)	29 June 1977	31 January 1989	11 years, 216 days	Yes (1982–1989)	Frank Wilkes	Resigned
13	Robert Fordham (1942–)	Footscray (1970–1992)	29 June 1977	31 January 1989	11 years, 216 days	Yes (1982–1989)	John Cain Jr.	Resigned
14	Joan Kirner (1938–2015)	Williamstown (1988–1994)	7 February 1989	9 August 1990	1 year, 183 days	Yes (1989–1990)	John Cain Jr.	Became leader following the resignation of John Cain Jr.
15	Jim Kennan (1946–2010)	Broadmeadows (1988–1993)	9 August 1990	22 March 1993	2 years, 225 days	Yes (1990–1992)	Joan Kirner	Became leader following the resignation of Joan Kirner
16	Bob Sercombe (1949–2025)	Niddrie (1988–1996)	22 March 1993	3 May 1994	1 year, 42 days	No	Jim Kennan	Resigned following failed attempt to oust John Brumby
16	Bob Sercombe (1949–2025)	Niddrie (1988–1996)	22 March 1993	3 May 1994	1 year, 42 days	No	John Brumby	Resigned following failed attempt to oust John Brumby
17	Demetri Dollis (1956–)	Richmond (1988–1999)	3 May 1994	23 December 1996	2 years, 234 days	No	John Brumby	Resigned
18	John Thwaites (1955–)	Albert Park (1992–2007)	23 December 1996	30 July 2007	10 years, 219 days	Yes (1999–2007)	John Brumby	Resigned
18	John Thwaites (1955–)	Albert Park (1992–2007)	23 December 1996	30 July 2007	10 years, 219 days	Yes (1999–2007)	Steve Bracks	Resigned
19	Rob Hulls (1957–)	Niddrie (1996–2012)	30 July 2007	2 February 2012	4 years, 187 days	Yes (2007–2010)	John Brumby	Resigned
19	Rob Hulls (1957–)	Niddrie (1996–2012)	30 July 2007	2 February 2012	4 years, 187 days	Yes (2007–2010)	Daniel Andrews	Resigned
20	James Merlino (1972–)	Monbulk (2002–2022)	2 February 2012	25 June 2022	10 years, 143 days	Yes (2014–2022)	Daniel Andrews	Resigned
21	Jacinta Allan (1973–)	Bendigo East (1999–2026)	25 June 2022	27 September 2023	1 year, 94 days	Yes (2022–2023)	Daniel Andrews	Became leader following the resignation of Daniel Andrews
22	Ben Carroll (1975–)	Niddrie (2012–)	27 September 2023	28 July 2026	2 years, 304 days	Yes (2023–2026)	Jacinta Allan	Became leader following a successful challenge against Jacinta Allan
23	Gabrielle Williams (1982–)	Dandenong (2014–)	28 July 2026	Incumbent	115 days	Yes (2026–)	Ben Carroll	

=== State Secretaries (organisational) ===
No.	State Secretary	Term	Government status
1	Stephen Barker	1901–1904	In Opposition
2	Patrick Heagney	1905–1910	In Opposition
3	Arch Stewart	1910–1924	Both
4	Danny McNamara	1925–1946	Both
5	Pat Kennelly	1947–1949	In Opposition
6	Dinny Lovegrove	1949–1955	Both
7	Jack Tripovich	1955–1960	In Opposition
8	Cyril Wyndham	1961–1963	In Opposition
9	Bill Hartley	1963–1970	In Opposition
10	Jean Melzer	1971–1974	In Opposition
11	Bill Tracey	1974–1976	In Opposition
12	Bob Hogg	1976–1983	Both
13	Peter Batchelor	1983–1990	In Government
14	Jenny Beacham	1990–1994	Both
15	John Lenders	1994–1999	In Opposition
16	David Feeney	1999–2002	In Government
17	Roland Lindell	2002–2003	In Government
18	Erik Locke	2003–2005	In Government
19	Stephen Newnham	2005–2009	In Government
20	Nicholas Reece	2009–2011	Both
21	Noah Carroll	2011–2016	Both
22	Samuel Rae	2016–2019	In Government
23	Clare Burns	2019–2021	In Government
24	Chris Ford	2021–2023	In Government
25	Steve Staikos	2024–present	In Government

== Election results ==
=== Legislative Assembly ===
Election	Leader	Votes	%	Seats	+/–	Position	Status
1892	William Trenwith	37,777	19.72	11 / 95	▲11	▲3rd	Crossbench
1894	William Trenwith	32,474	19.82	18 / 95	▲7	▲3rd	Crossbench
1897	William Trenwith	19,371	10.44	8 / 95	▼10	3rd	Crossbench
1900	William Trenwith	17,952	11.22	9 / 95	▲1	▼4th	Crossbench
1902	Frederick Bromley	30,804	18.01	12 / 95	▲3	▲3rd	Crossbench
1904	Frederick Bromley	49,922	32.55	17 / 67	▲5	▲2nd	Opposition
1907	George Prendergast	40,044	34.40	14 / 65	▼3	2nd	Opposition
1908	George Prendergast	30,605	34.78	21 / 65	▲7	2nd	Opposition
1911	George Prendergast	167,422	43.06	20 / 65	▼1	2nd	Opposition
1914	George Elmslie	123,752	39.58	22 / 65	▲2	2nd	Opposition
1917	George Elmslie	111,637	32.29	18 / 65	▼4	2nd	Opposition
1920	George Prendergast	131,083	29.28	20 / 65	▲2	2nd	Opposition
1921	George Prendergast	115,432	35.69	21 / 65	▲1	▲1st	Opposition
1924	George Prendergast	128,056	34.87	27 / 65	▲6	1st	Minority (1924)
1924	George Prendergast	128,056	34.87	27 / 65	▲6	1st	Opposition (1924–1927)
1927	Edmond Hogan	319,848	41.79	28 / 65	▲1	1st	Minority (1927–1928)
1927	Edmond Hogan	319,848	41.79	28 / 65	▲1	1st	Opposition (1928–1929)
1929	Edmond Hogan	247,251	39.09	30 / 65	▲2	▼2nd	Minority
1932	Tom Tunnecliffe	237,993	35.14	16 / 65	▼14	2nd	Opposition
1935	Tom Tunnecliffe	318,390	37.93	17 / 65	▲1	2nd	Opposition (1935)
1935	Tom Tunnecliffe	318,390	37.93	17 / 65	▲1	2nd	Support (1935–1937)
1937	Tom Tunnecliffe	322,699	41.03	20 / 65	▲3	2nd	Support
1940	John Cain	256,744	33.17	22 / 65	▲2	▲1st	Support
1943	John Cain	311,051	36.13	22 / 65	Steady	1st	Opposition (1943)
1943	John Cain	311,051	36.13	22 / 65	Steady	1st	Minority (1943)
1943	John Cain	311,051	36.13	22 / 65	Steady	1st	Opposition (1943–1945)
1945	John Cain	360,079	41.02	31 / 65	▲9	1st	Minority
1947	John Cain	486,635	40.87	17 / 65	▼14	▼2nd	Opposition
1950	John Cain	546,978	45.29	24 / 65	▲7	2nd	Opposition (1950)
1950	John Cain	546,978	45.29	24 / 65	▲7	2nd	Support (1950–1952)
1950	John Cain	546,978	45.29	24 / 65	▲7	2nd	Opposition (1952)
1952	John Cain	504,773	49.07	37 / 65	▲13	▲1st	Majority
1955	John Cain	420,197	32.57	20 / 66	▼17	▼2nd	Opposition
1958	Ernie Shepherd	515,638	37.70	18 / 66	▼2	2nd	Opposition
1961	Clive Stoneham	552,015	38.55	17 / 66	▼1	2nd	Opposition
1964	Clive Stoneham	546,279	36.22	18 / 66	▲1	2nd	Opposition
1967	Clive Stoneham	596,520	37.90	16 / 73	▼2	2nd	Opposition
1970	Clyde Holding	693,105	41.42	22 / 73	▲6	2nd	Opposition
1973	Clyde Holding	789,561	41.61	18 / 73	▼4	2nd	Opposition
1976	Clyde Holding	869,021	42.43	21 / 81	▲3	2nd	Opposition
1979	Frank Wilkes	962,123	45.23	32 / 81	▲11	2nd	Opposition
1982	John Cain	1,122,887	50.01	49 / 81	▲17	▲1st	Majority
1985	John Cain	1,198,262	50.01	47 / 88	▼2	1st	Majority
1988	John Cain	1,131,750	46.55	46 / 88	▼1	1st	Majority
1992	Joan Kirner	1,003,495	38.41	27 / 88	▼19	▼2nd	Opposition
1996	John Brumby	1,189,475	43.13	29 / 88	▲2	2nd	Opposition
1999	Steve Bracks	1,289,696	45.57	42 / 88	▲13	▲1st	Minority
2002	Steve Bracks	1,392,704	47.95	62 / 88	▲20	1st	Majority
2006	Steve Bracks	1,278,046	43.06	55 / 88	▼7	1st	Majority
2010	John Brumby	1,147,348	36.25	43 / 88	▼12	1st	Opposition
2014	Daniel Andrews	1,278,436	38.10	47 / 88	▲4	1st	Majority
2018	Daniel Andrews	1,506,467	42.86	55 / 88	▲8	1st	Majority
2022	Daniel Andrews	1,339,496	36.66	56 / 88	▲1	1st	Majority

=== House of Representatives ===
Election	Votes	%	Seats	+/–
1901	11,156	8.70	2 / 23	▲2
1903	69,959	27.10	2 / 23	Steady
1906	111,626	30.40	4 / 22	▲2
1910	221,660	48.10	11 / 22	▲7
1913	287,221	46.80	9 / 21	▼2
1914	238,079	45.80	12 / 21	▲3
1917	271,033	46.60	7 / 21	▼5
1919	225,420	38.10	6 / 21	▼1
1922	194,024	42.20	8 / 20	▲2
1925	401,848	44.80	7 / 20	▼1
1928	334,792	39.70	8 / 20	▲1
1929	412,595	48.90	13 / 20	▲5
1931	319,151	34.20	4 / 20	▼9
1934	370,885	36.40	6 / 20	▲2
1937	381,042	39.30	7 / 20	▲1
1940	486,884	43.50	9 / 20	▲2
1943	518,600	43.40	9 / 20	Steady
1946	592,000	47.90	8 / 20	▼1
1949	604,793	46.80	13 / 33	▲5
1951	644,153	49.10	15 / 33	▲2
1954	636,911	50.30	15 / 33	Steady
1955	493,509	37.10	10 / 33	▼5
1958	555,470	39.50	10 / 33	Steady
1961	615,693	41.60	10 / 33	Steady
1963	620,253	40.40	10 / 33	Steady
1966	548,743	35.10	8 / 33	▼2
1969	689,515	41.30	11 / 34	▲3
1972	854,201	47.30	14 / 34	▲3
1974	970,236	47.90	16 / 34	▲2
1975	882,842	42.10	10 / 34	▼6
1977	791,083	37.20	10 / 33	Steady
1980	1,016,617	45.50	17 / 33	▲7
1983	1,182,118	50.50	23 / 33	▲6
1984	1,117,874	48.90	25 / 39	▲2
1987	1,139,337	46.90	24 / 39	▼1
1990	951,674	37.10	14 / 38	▼10
1993	1,273,974	46.40	17 / 38	▲3
1996	1,190,404	42.90	16 / 37	▼1
1998	1,261,289	44.40	19 / 37	▲3
2001	1,230,764	41.70	20 / 37	▲1
2004	1,217,921	40.45	19 / 37	▼1
2007	1,416,215	44.69	21 / 37	▲2
2010	1,361,416	42.81	22 / 37	▲1
2013	1,146,894	34.81	19 / 37	▼3
2016	1,224,051	35.58	18 / 37	▼1
2019	1,361,913	36.86	21 / 38	▲3
2022	1,119,081	33.03	24 / 39	▲3
2025	1,375,995	33.95	27 / 38	▲3
