= Results of the 1908 Victorian state election (Legislative Assembly) =

1908 Victorian Legislative Assembly state election results

Victorian state election, 29 December 1908 Legislative Assembly << 1907–1911 >>
Enrolled voters	262,876				
Votes cast	88,460		Turnout	33.65	–11.89
Informal votes	465		Informal	0.53	–0.06
Summary of votes by party
Party	Primary votes	%	Swing	Seats	Change
Labor	30,605	34.78	+0.38	21	+7
Liberal	29,866	33.94	+33.94	18	+18
United Liberal	17,578	19.98	–31.38	24	–25
Independent Liberal	5,455	6.20	+6.20	2	+2
Ind. Ministerialist	539	0.61	–8.86	0	–1
Victorian Socialist	167	0.19	+0.19	0	±0
Independent	3,785	4.30	+1.94	0	–1
Total	87,995			65	

This is a list of electoral district results for the 1908 Victorian state election.

== Results by electoral district ==
=== Abbotsford ===
1908 Victorian state election: Abbotsford
Party	Candidate	Votes	%	±%
Labor	William Beazley	unopposed		
Labor hold		Swing		

=== Albert Park ===
1908 Victorian state election: Albert Park
Party	Candidate	Votes	%	±%
Labor	George Elmslie	1,693	62.0	+2.6
Liberal	Ernest Wells	1,039	38.0	–2.6
Total formal votes		2,732	99.3	+0.1
Informal votes		19	0.7	–0.1
Turnout		10,094	56.0	+2.8
Labor hold		Swing	+2.6	

=== Allandale ===
1908 Victorian state election: Allandale
Party	Candidate	Votes	%	±%
Liberal	Alexander Peacock	unopposed		
Liberal gain from United Liberal		Swing		

=== Ballarat East ===
1908 Victorian state election: Ballarat East
Party	Candidate	Votes	%	±%
Liberal	Robert McGregor	1,291	52.5	
Labor	Archibald Stewart	1,169	47.5	
Total formal votes		2,460	99.5	
Informal votes		13	0.5	
Turnout		2,473	59.5	
Liberal gain from United Liberal		Swing	N/A	

=== Ballarat West ===
1908 Victorian state election: Ballarat West
Party	Candidate	Votes	%	±%
Labor	Andrew McKissock	1,198	51.7	+16.9
United Liberal	Joseph Kirton	1,117	48.3	+2.8
Total formal votes		2,315	99.8	–0.0
Informal votes		5	0.2	+0.0
Turnout		2,320	58.2	–7.1
Labor gain from United Liberal		Swing	+16.9	

=== Barwon ===
1908 Victorian state election: Barwon
Party	Candidate	Votes	%	±%
United Liberal	James Farrer	805	39.8	+3.1
Liberal	Robert Robertson	728	36.0	+17.7
Labor	Daniel McNamara	489	24.2	–4.3
Total formal votes		2,022	99.4	+0.0
Informal votes		12	0.6	–0.0
Turnout		2,034	50.9	–12.6
United Liberal hold		Swing	+3.1	

=== Benalla ===
1908 Victorian state election: Benalla
Party	Candidate	Votes	%	±%
Liberal	John Carlisle	973	61.5	
Liberal	John Elshaug	609	38.5	
Total formal votes		1,582	96.4	
Informal votes		7	0.4	
Turnout		1,589	44.7	
Liberal gain from United Liberal		Swing	N/A	

=== Benambra ===
1908 Victorian state election: Benambra
Party	Candidate	Votes	%	±%
United Liberal	Albert Craven	930	58.9	
Labor	Abraham Wright	649	41.1	
Total formal votes		1,579	99.6	
Informal votes		7	0.04	
Turnout		1,586	56.8	
United Liberal hold		Swing	N/A	

=== Bendigo East ===
1908 Victorian state election: Bendigo East
Party	Candidate	Votes	%	±%
Labor	Thomas Glass	1,230	55.1	–2.1
Liberal	Walter Hamilton	1,002	44.9	+2.1
Total formal votes		2,232	99.6	+0.2
Informal votes		10	0.4	–0.2
Turnout		2,242	55.9	–10.3
Labor hold		Swing	–2.1	

=== Bendigo West ===
1908 Victorian state election: Bendigo West
Party	Candidate	Votes	%	±%
Labor	David Smith	unopposed		
Labor hold		Swing		

=== Boroondara ===
1908 Victorian state election: Boroondara
Party	Candidate	Votes	%	±%
United Liberal	Frank Madden	1,329	50.2	–18.0
Liberal	Alfred Lumsden	1,318	49.8	+49.8
Total formal votes		2,647	99.6	–0.0
Informal votes		11	0.4	+0.0
Turnout		2,658	42.0	–27.6
United Liberal hold		Swing	N/A	

=== Borung ===
1908 Victorian state election: Borung
Party	Candidate	Votes	%	±%
United Liberal	William Hutchinson	unopposed		
United Liberal hold		Swing		

=== Brighton ===
1908 Victorian state election: Brighton
Party	Candidate	Votes	%	±%
United Liberal	Thomas Bent	unopposed		
United Liberal hold		Swing		

=== Brunswick ===
1908 Victorian state election: Brunswick
Party	Candidate	Votes	%	±%
Labor	Frank Anstey	unopposed		
Labor hold		Swing	N/A	

=== Bulla ===
1908 Victorian state election: Bulla
Party	Candidate	Votes	%	±%
United Liberal	Andrew Robertson	unopposed		
United Liberal hold		Swing	N/A	

=== Carlton ===
1908 Victorian state election: Carlton
Party	Candidate	Votes	%	±%
Labor	Robert Solly	unopposed		
Labor hold		Swing	N/A	

=== Castlemaine and Maldon ===
1908 Victorian state election: Castlemaine and Maldon
Party	Candidate	Votes	%	±%
United Liberal	Harry Lawson	unopposed		
United Liberal hold		Swing	N/A	

=== Collingwood ===
1908 Victorian state election: Collingwood
Party	Candidate	Votes	%	±%
Labor	Martin Hannah	984	40.2	+40.2
Independent Ministerial	Edgar Wilkins	816	33.1	–23.7
Liberal	Harry Evans	565	23.1	+23.1
Victorian Socialist	Percy Laidler	85	3.5	+3.5
Total formal votes		2,923	99.6	
Informal votes		13	0.4	
Turnout		2,936	65.3	
Labor gain from Independent Ministerial		Swing	+40.2	

=== Dalhousie ===
1908 Victorian state election: Dalhousie
Party	Candidate	Votes	%	±%
United Liberal	Reginald Argyle	1,364	50.4	–0.1
Independent	John Duffy	1,344	49.6	+0.1
Total formal votes		2,708	99.3	–0.0
Informal votes		20	0.7	+0.0
Turnout		2,728	75.8	+2.8
United Liberal hold		Swing	N/A	

=== Dandenong ===
1908 Victorian state election: Dandenong
Party	Candidate	Votes	%	±%
Liberal	William Keast	1,197	56.7	–22.7
United Liberal	James Wilson	915	43.3	+43.3
Total formal votes		2,112	99.5	–0.1
Informal votes		10	0.5	+0.1
Turnout		2,122	48.6	+9.2
Liberal gain from United Liberal		Swing		

=== Daylesford ===
1908 Victorian state election: Daylesford
Party	Candidate	Votes	%	±%
United Liberal	Donald McLeod	1,001	48.5	–17.5
Labor	William Young	605	29.3	–4.7
Liberal	Hugh Ross	457	22.1	+22.1
Total formal votes		2,063	99.4	+0.2
Informal votes		12	0.6	–0.2
Turnout		2,075	64.1	–2.9
United Liberal hold		Swing	N/A	

=== Dundas ===
1908 Victorian state election: Dundas
Party	Candidate	Votes	%	±%
United Liberal	John Thomson	1,122	52.0	–2.8
Labor	Albert Blakey	1,035	48.0	+2.8
Total formal votes		2,157	99.5	+0.9
Informal votes		12	0.5	–0.9
Turnout		2,169	67.1	+0.6
United Liberal hold		Swing	–2.8	

=== Eaglehawk ===
1908 Victorian state election: Eaglehawk
Party	Candidate	Votes	%	±%
Labor	Tom Tunnecliffe	1,333	53.7	+2.6
Liberal	Henry Williams	1,148	46.3	–2.6
Total formal votes		2,481	99.8	+0.4
Informal votes		6	0.2	–0.4
Turnout		2,487	66.7	–0.3
Labor hold		Swing	+2.6	

=== East Melbourne ===
1908 Victorian state election: East Melbourne
Party	Candidate	Votes	%	±%
United Liberal	Henry Weedon	unopposed		
United Liberal hold		Swing	N/A	

=== Essendon ===
1908 Victorian state election: Essendon
Party	Candidate	Votes	%	±%
Liberal	William Watt	1,469	45.4	
Labor	James Fenton	1,321	41.0	–5.6
United Liberal	Harry Hall	435	13.5	
Total formal votes		3,225	99.6	–0.1
Informal votes		12	0.4	+0.1
Turnout		3,237	52.2	–9.4
Liberal gain from United Liberal		Swing	N/A	

=== Evelyn ===
1908 Victorian state election: Evelyn
Party	Candidate	Votes	%	±%
United Liberal	Ewen Cameron	815	60.0	
Liberal	James Rouget	543	40.0	
Total formal votes		1,358	99.5	
Informal votes		7	0.5	
Turnout		1,365	36.7	
United Liberal hold		Swing	N/A	

=== Fitzroy ===
1908 Victorian state election: Fitzroy
Party	Candidate	Votes	%	±%
Labor	John Billson	1,105	51.2	–4.4
Liberal	Alexander McNair	1,052	48.8	+4.4
Total formal votes		2,165	99.5	+0.2
Informal votes		7	0.5	–0.2
Turnout		2,172	53.5	–10.2
Labor hold		Swing	–4.4	

=== Flemington ===
1908 Victorian state election: Flemington
Party	Candidate	Votes	%	±%
Labor	Edward Warde	1,439	52.5	+1.1
Liberal	Alexander McDonald	1,303	47.5	–1.1
Total formal votes		2,742	99.4	–0.2
Informal votes		17	0.6	+0.2
Turnout		2,759	50.7	–7.1
Labor hold		Swing	+1.1	

=== Geelong ===
1908 Victorian state election: Geelong
Party	Candidate	Votes	%	±%
Labor	William Plain	1,406	55.4	+9.7
United Liberal	William Gurr	768	30.2	–24.1
United Liberal	Albyn Morley	366	14.4	+14.4
Total formal votes		2,540	99.7	+0.9
Informal votes		7	0.3	–0.9
Turnout		2,547	56.8	–6.6
Labor gain from United Liberal		Swing	N/A	

=== Gippsland East ===
1908 Victorian state election: Gippsland East
Party	Candidate	Votes	%	±%
Liberal	James Cameron	1,075	70.7	+5.7
Liberal	Pelling Conant	446	29.3	+29.3
Total formal votes		1,521	99.1	–0.6
Informal votes		14	0.9	+0.6
Turnout		1,535	48.4	–14.9
Liberal gain from United Liberal		Swing		

=== Gippsland North ===
1908 Victorian state election: Gippsland North
Party	Candidate	Votes	%	±%
Labor	James McLachlan	870	44.4	+44.4
Liberal	Hubert Keogh	812	41.1	
United Liberal	Walter Lyon	279	14.2	
Total formal votes		1,980	99.0	–0.8
Informal votes		19	1.0	+0.8
Turnout		1,980	62.7	+5.1
Labor gain from United Liberal		Swing		

=== Gippsland South ===
1908 Victorian state election: Gippsland South
Party	Candidate	Votes	%	±%
Liberal	Thomas Livingston	unopposed		
Liberal gain from United Liberal		Swing		

=== Gippsland West ===
1908 Victorian state election: Gippsland West
Party	Candidate	Votes	%	±%
United Liberal	John Mackey	unopposed		
United Liberal hold		Swing		

=== Glenelg ===
1908 Victorian state election: Glenelg
Party	Candidate	Votes	%	±%
United Liberal	Hugh Campbell	unopposed		
United Liberal hold		Swing		

=== Goulburn Valley ===
1908 Victorian state election: Goulburn Valley
Party	Candidate	Votes	%	±%
United Liberal	George Graham	unopposed		
United Liberal hold		Swing		

=== Grenville ===
1908 Victorian state election: Grenville
Party	Candidate	Votes	%	±%
Labor	Charles McGrath	1,610	72.0	
Liberal	David Kerr	627	28.0	
Total formal votes		2,237	98.8	
Informal votes		28	1.2	
Turnout		2,265	63.2	
Labor hold		Swing	N/A	

=== Gunbower ===
1908 Victorian state election: Gunbower
Party	Candidate	Votes	%	±%
United Liberal	John Cullen	unopposed		
United Liberal hold		Swing		

=== Hampden ===
1908 Victorian state election: Hampden
Party	Candidate	Votes	%	±%
Liberal	David Oman	1,229	61.0	
Labor	Patrick McMahon	787	39.0	
Total formal votes		2,016	99.5	
Informal votes		10	0.5	
Turnout		2,026	50.3	
Liberal gain from United Liberal		Swing	N/A	

=== Hawthorn ===
1908 Victorian state election: Hawthorn
Party	Candidate	Votes	%	±%
United Liberal	George Swinburne	1,425	50.1	–18.3
Liberal	Frederick Dawborn	1,419	49.9	+49.9
Total formal votes		2,838	99.5	–0.0
Informal votes		18	0.5	+0.0
Turnout		2,856	47.6	–9.0
United Liberal hold		Swing	–18.3	

=== Jika Jika ===
1908 Victorian state election: Jika Jika
Party	Candidate	Votes	%	±%
Liberal	James Membrey	1,569	54.6	–1.2
Labor	Henry Beard	1,303	45.4	+1.2
Total formal votes		2,872	99.7	+1.0
Informal votes		10	0.3	–1.0
Turnout		2,882	47.7	–8.2
Liberal gain from United Liberal		Swing	–1.2	

=== Kara Kara ===
1908 Victorian state election: Kara Kara
Party	Candidate	Votes	%	±%
United Liberal	Peter McBride	unopposed		
United Liberal hold		Swing		

=== Korong ===
1908 Victorian state election: Korong
Party	Candidate	Votes	%	±%
Liberal	Thomas Langdon	unopposed		
Liberal gain from United Liberal		Swing		

=== Lowan ===
1908 Victorian state election: Lowan
Party	Candidate	Votes	%	±%
United Liberal	Robert Stanley	unopposed		
United Liberal hold		Swing		

=== Maryborough ===
1908 Victorian state election: Maryborough
Party	Candidate	Votes	%	±%
Labor	Alfred Outtrim	unopposed		
Labor hold		Swing		

=== Melbourne ===
1908 Victorian state election: Melbourne
Party	Candidate	Votes	%	±%
Labor	Alexander Rogers	781	35.6	+0.3
United Liberal	John Hamilton	668	30.5	
Liberal	James Boyd	661	30.1	
Victorian Socialist	Angus McDonell	82	3.7	+3.7
Total formal votes		2,192	99.4	+0.3
Informal votes		14	0.6	–0.3
Turnout		2,206	39.1	–8.6
Labor gain from United Liberal		Swing	+20.2	

=== Mornington ===
1908 Victorian state election: Mornington
Party	Candidate	Votes	%	±%
United Liberal	Alfred Downward	unopposed		
United Liberal hold		Swing		

=== North Melbourne ===
1908 Victorian state election: North Melbourne
Party	Candidate	Votes	%	±%
Labor	George Prendergast	unopposed		
Labor hold		Swing		

=== Ovens ===
1908 Victorian state election: Ovens
Party	Candidate	Votes	%	±%
Liberal	Alfred Billson	1,057	61.6	–5.9
Labor	Parker Moloney	658	32.5	+5.9
Total formal votes		1,715	99.3	+0.6
Informal votes		12	0.7	–0.6
Turnout		1,727	58.6	–7.4
Liberal gain from United Liberal		Swing	–5.9	

=== Polwarth ===
1908 Victorian state election: Polwarth
Party	Candidate	Votes	%	±%
United Liberal	Charles Forrest	1,310	59.3	–21.8
Labor	Thomas Carey	698	31.6	+2.7
Liberal	John Hancock	200	9.1	+9.1
Total formal votes		2,208	99.6	+0.6
Informal votes		7	0.3	–0.6
Turnout		2,215	58.1	+1.6
United Liberal hold		Swing	N/A	

=== Port Fairy ===
1908 Victorian state election: Port Fairy
Party	Candidate	Votes	%	±%
Labor	Jeremiah Wall	1,318	53.1	+4.9
United Liberal	James Duffus	1,162	46.9	–4.9
Total formal votes		2,480	99.2	+0.1
Informal votes		21	0.8	–0.1
Turnout		2,501	68.6	–2.4
Labor gain from United Liberal		Swing	+4.9	

=== Port Melbourne ===
1908 Victorian state election: Port Melbourne
Party	Candidate	Votes	%	±%
Labor	George Sangster	unopposed		
Labor hold		Swing		

=== Prahran ===
1908 Victorian state election: Prahran
Party	Candidate	Votes	%	±%
Liberal	Donald Mackinnon	1,770	67.5	+2.4
Labor	Patrick McCarthy	851	32.5	–2.4
Total formal votes		2,621	99.8	–0.0
Informal votes		6	0.2	+0.0
Turnout		2,627	52.9	–11.0
Liberal gain from United Liberal		Swing	+2.4	

=== Richmond ===
1908 Victorian state election: Richmond
Party	Candidate	Votes	%	±%
Labor	Ted Cotter	1,812	66.4	+3.3
Independent	George Freeman	916	33.6	+33.6
Total formal votes		2,730	99.8	–0.0
Informal votes		7	0.2	+0.0
Turnout		2,737	52.3	–16.1
Labor hold		Swing	+3.3	

=== Rodney ===
1908 Victorian state election: Rodney
Party	Candidate	Votes	%	±%
United Liberal	Hugh McKenzie	unopposed		
United Liberal hold		Swing		

=== St Kilda ===
1908 Victorian state election: St Kilda
Party	Candidate	Votes	%	±%
Independent Liberal	Robert McCutcheon	1,139	62.1	+0.0
United Liberal	Frederick Gray	695	37.9	+37.9
Total formal votes		1,834	99.1	–0.5
Informal votes		17	0.9	+0.5
Turnout		1,851	36.9	–13.8
Independent gain from United Liberal		Swing	+0.0	

=== Stawell and Ararat ===
1908 Victorian state election: Stawell and Ararat
Party	Candidate	Votes	%	±%
Liberal	Richard Toutcher	943	44.6	–19.3
Labor	William Sewell	693	32.7	–3.4
United Liberal	Hugh Menzies	480	22.7	+22.7
Total formal votes		2,116	99.6	+0.1
Informal votes		8	0.4	–0.1
Turnout		2,124	63.8	–0.0
Liberal gain from United Liberal		Swing	–8.0	

=== Swan Hill ===
1908 Victorian state election: Swan Hill
Party	Candidate	Votes	%	±%
Liberal	John Gray	unopposed		
Liberal gain from United Liberal		Swing		

=== Toorak ===
1908 Victorian state election: Toorak
Party	Candidate	Votes	%	±%
Independent Liberal	Norman Bayles	1,221	53.9	–11.3
Independent Liberal	Frank Cornwall	1,044	46.1	+11.3
Total formal votes		2,265	99.7	+0.1
Informal votes		8	0.3	–0.1
Turnout		2,273	46.3	–3.1
Independent gain from United Liberal		Swing	–11.3	

=== Upper Goulburn ===
1908 Victorian state election: Upper Goulburn
Party	Candidate	Votes	%	±%
Liberal	George Cookson	1,120	52.0	+52.0
United Liberal	Thomas Hunt	1,036	48.0	–2.4
Total formal votes		2,156	99.4	+0.2
Informal votes		8	0.4	–0.2
Turnout		2,164	57.5	–7.9
Liberal gain from United Liberal		Swing	+2.4	

=== Walhalla ===
1908 Victorian state election: Walhalla
Party	Candidate	Votes	%	±%
United Liberal	Albert Harris	unopposed		
United Liberal hold		Swing		

=== Wangaratta ===
1908 Victorian state election: Wangaratta
Party	Candidate	Votes	%	±%
United Liberal	John Bowser	unopposed		
United Liberal hold		Swing		

=== Waranga ===
1908 Victorian state election: Waranga
Party	Candidate	Votes	%	±%
United Liberal	Martin Cussen	604	28.8	
Independent	John Gordon	539	25.7	
Liberal	Henry Thomas	412	20.0	
United Liberal	John Stewart	377	18.0	
Independent	Arthur Chanter	163	7.8	
Total formal votes		2,095	99.2	–0.2
Informal votes		16	0.8	+0.2
Turnout		2,111	72.1	+4.1
United Liberal hold		Swing		

=== Warrenheip ===
1908 Victorian state election: Warrenheip
Party	Candidate	Votes	%	±%
Liberal	George Holden	947	53.9	–2.2
Labor	Christopher Fitzgerald	405	23.1	–20.8
Independent	Michael Honan	404	23.0	+23.0
Total formal votes		1,756	99.7	+0.8
Informal votes		6	0.3	–0.8
Turnout		1,762	60.9	–5.9
Liberal gain from United Liberal		Swing	+9.3	

=== Warrnambool ===
1908 Victorian state election: Warrnambool
Party	Candidate	Votes	%	±%
Liberal	John Murray	1,238	67.7	
Labor	Charles Gray	592	32.3	
Total formal votes		1,830	99.5	
Informal votes		10	0.5	
Turnout		1,840	57.2	
Liberal gain from United Liberal		Swing	N/A	

=== Williamstown ===
1908 Victorian state election: Williamstown
Party	Candidate	Votes	%	±%
Labor	John Lemmon	2,332	78.1	+20.6
Liberal	Joseph Gates	654	21.9	–20.6
Total formal votes		2,986	99.6	+0.4
Informal votes		9	0.3	–0.4
Turnout		2,995	48.7	–11.6
Labor hold		Swing	+20.6	

== See also ==
- 1908 Victorian state election
- Candidates of the 1908 Victorian state election
- Members of the Victorian Legislative Assembly, 1907–1908
