= Candidates of the 1908 Victorian state election =

Candidates who ran in the 1908 Victorian State Election

The 1908 Victorian state election was held on 29 December 1908.

== Retiring Members ==
=== United Liberal ===
- John Walter Mason (Waranga)

== Legislative Assembly ==
Sitting members are shown in bold text. Successful candidates are highlighted in the relevant colour. Where there is possible confusion, an asterisk (*) is also used.

Electorate	Held by	Labour candidates	Liberal candidates	United Liberal candidates	Other candidates
Abbotsford	Labor	**William Beazley**			
Albert Park	Labor	**George Elmslie**	Ernest Wells		
Allandale	United Liberal		**Alexander Peacock**		
Ballarat East	United Liberal	Archibald Stewart	**Robert McGregor**		
Ballarat West	United Liberal	Andrew McKissock		**Joseph Kirton**	
Barwon	United Liberal	Daniel McNamara	Robert Robertson	**James Farrer**	
Benalla	United Liberal		**John Carlisle***; John Elshaug		
Benambra	United Liberal	Abraham Wright		**Albert Craven**	
Bendigo East	Labor	**Thomas Glass**	Walter Hamilton		
Bendigo West	Labor	**David Smith**			
Boroondara	United Liberal		Alfred Lumsden	**Frank Madden**	
Borung	United Liberal			**William Hutchinson**	
Brighton	United Liberal			**Thomas Bent**	
Brunswick	Labor	**Frank Anstey**			
Bulla	United Liberal			**Andrew Robertson**	
Carlton	Labor	**Robert Solly**			
Castlemaine and Maldon	United Liberal			**Harry Lawson**	
Collingwood	Labor	**Martin Hannah**	Harry Evans		Percy Laidler (VSP); Edgar Wilkins (Ind. Min)
Dalhousie	United Liberal			**Reginald Argyle**	John Duffy (Ind)
Dandenong	United Liberal		**William Keast**	James Wilson	
Daylesford	United Liberal	William Young	Hugh Ross	**Donald McLeod**	
Dundas	United Liberal	Albert Blakey		**John Thomson**	
Eaglehawk	Labor	**Tom Tunnecliffe**	Henry Williams		
East Melbourne	United Liberal		**Henry Weedon**		
Essendon	United Liberal	James Fenton	**William Watt**	Harry Hall	
Evelyn	United Liberal		James Rouget	**Ewen Cameron**	
Fitzroy	Labor	**John Billson**	Alexander McNair		
Flemington	Labor	**Edward Warde**	Alexander McDonald		
Geelong	Labor	**William Plain**		William Gurr; Albyn Morley	
Gippsland East	United Liberal		**James Cameron***; Pelling Conant		
Gippsland North	Labor	**James McLachlan**	Hubert Keogh	Walter Lyon	
Gippsland South	United Liberal		**Thomas Livingston**		
Gippsland West	United Liberal			**John Mackey**	
Glenelg	United Liberal			**Hugh Campbell**	
Goulburn Valley	United Liberal			**George Graham**	
Grenville	Labor	**Charles McGrath**	David Kerr		
Gunbower	United Liberal			**John Cullen**	
Hampden	United Liberal	Patrick McMahon	**David Oman**		
Hawthorn	United Liberal		Frederick Dawborn	**George Swinburne**	
Jika Jika	United Liberal	Henry Beard	**James Membrey**		
Kara Kara	United Liberal			**Peter McBride**	
Korong	United Liberal		**Thomas Langdon**		
Lowan	United Liberal			**Robert Stanley**	
Maryborough	Labor	**Alfred Outtrim**			
Melbourne	United Liberal	Alexander Rogers	**James Boyd**	John Hamilton	Angus McDonell (VSP)
Mornington	United Liberal			**Alfred Downward**	
North Melbourne	Labor	**George Prendergast**			
Ovens	United Liberal	Parker Moloney	**Alfred Billson**		
Polwarth	United Liberal	Thomas Carey	John Hancock	**Charles Forrest**	
Port Fairy	United Liberal	Jeremiah Wall		**James Duffus**	
Port Melbourne	Labor	**George Sangster**			
Prahran	United Liberal	Patrick McCarthy	**Donald Mackinnon**		
Richmond	Labor	**Ted Cotter**			George Freeman (Ind)
Rodney	United Liberal			**Hugh McKenzie**	
St Kilda	United Liberal			Frederick Gray	**Robert McCutcheon**
Stawell and Ararat	United Liberal	William Sewell	**Richard Toutcher**	Hugh Menzies	
Swan Hill	United Liberal		**John Gray**		
Toorak	United Liberal				**Norman Bayles*** (Ind. Lib); Frank Cornwall (Ind. Lib)
Upper Goulburn	United Liberal		George Cookson	**Thomas Hunt**	
Walhalla	United Liberal			**Albert Harris**	
Wangaratta	United Liberal			**John Bowser**	
Waranga	United Liberal		Henry Thomas	Martin Cussen*; John Gordon	Arthur Chanter (Ind); John Gordon (Ind)
Warrenheip	United Liberal	Christopher Fitzgerald	**George Holden**		Michael Honan (Ind)
Warrnambool	United Liberal	Charles Gray	**John Murray**		
Williamstown	Labor	**John Lemmon**	Joseph Gates		

== See also ==
- Members of the Victorian Legislative Assembly, 1907–1908
- Members of the Victorian Legislative Assembly, 1908–1911
