= Electoral results for the district of Port Fairy =

Victoria, Australia, district election results

This is a list of electoral results for the electoral district of Port Fairy in Victorian state elections.

== Members for Port Fairy ==
Member	Party	Term
Bryan O'Loghlen	Unaligned	1889–1894
James Duffus	Unaligned	1894–1897
Bryan O'Loghlen	Unaligned	1897–1900
James Duffus	Unaligned	1900–1908
Jeremiah Wall	Labor	1908–1911
James Duffus	Liberal	1911–1914
Henry Bailey	Labor	1914–1927

== Election results ==
=== Elections in the 1920s ===
1924 Victorian state election: Port Fairy
Party	Candidate	Votes	%	±%
Labor	Henry Bailey	unopposed		
Labor hold		Swing		

1921 Victorian state election: Port Fairy
Party	Candidate	Votes	%	±%
Labor	Henry Bailey	3,438	73.8	−26.2
Nationalist	William Downing	1,222	26.2	+26.2
Total formal votes		4,660	99.3	
Informal votes		35	0.7	
Turnout		4,695	58.3	
Labor hold		Swing	N/A	

1920 Victorian state election: Port Fairy
Party	Candidate	Votes	%	±%
Labor	Henry Bailey	unopposed		
Labor hold		Swing		

=== Elections in the 1910s ===
1917 Victorian state election: Port Fairy
Party	Candidate	Votes	%	±%
Labor	Henry Bailey	3,517	67.5	+15.0
Nationalist	Alfred Noar	1,691	32.5	−15.0
Total formal votes		5,208	98.6	+0.9
Informal votes		75	1.4	−0.9
Turnout		5,283	67.7	−3.5
Labor hold		Swing	+15.0	

1914 Victorian state election: Port Fairy
Party	Candidate	Votes	%	±%
Labor	Henry Bailey	2,874	52.5	+3.0
Liberal	James Duffus	2,602	47.5	−3.0
Total formal votes		5,476	97.7	+1.6
Informal votes		132	2.3	−1.6
Turnout		5,608	71.2	−5.5
Labor gain from Liberal		Swing	+3.0	

1911 Victorian state election: Port Fairy
Party	Candidate	Votes	%	±%
Liberal	James Duffus	2,839	50.5	+3.6
Labor	Jeremiah Wall	2,781	49.5	−3.6
Total formal votes		5,620	96.1	−3.1
Informal votes		228	3.9	+3.1
Turnout		5,848	76.7	+8.1
Liberal gain from Labor		Swing	+3.6	
