= Infamous Victory: Ben Chifley's Battle for Coal =

- Written by: Bob Ellis; Geoff Burton
- Directed by: Geoff Burton
- Starring: Tony Barry
- Country of origin: Australia
- Original language: English

Production
- Running time: 55 minutes

Original release
- Release: 6 November 2008

Infamous Victory: Ben Chifley's Battle for Coal is a 2008 Australian documentary about the 1949 Australian coal strike. It combines documentary footage with dramatised re-enactments.

== Cast ==
- Tony Barry as Ben Chifley
- Tracy Mann as Elizabeth Chifley
- Lorna Lesley as Phyllis Donnelly
- Rhys Muldoon as Edgar Ross
- Frankie J Holden as Arthur Calwell
- Kieran Darcy-Smith as Don Rogers
- Russell Kiefel as Lloyd Ross

== Production ==
The script was written by Bob Ellis who had often written about Chifley. "All my youth and young manhood there was a legend around Labor circles of this perfectly good man, who was an engine driver, and brought up dirt poor, and turned Australia inside out and into something better after the war," he said. "And died too soon, too unjustly." While developing the series The True Believers, a drama about the Australian Labor Party from World War II to the Australian Labor Party split of 1955, Ellis's preferred actor to play Chifley was Tony Barry. He introduced him to Hec MacMillan, who had worked for Chifley, who commented '[t]ake about five pounds off him and he's perfect.' The script was in the hands of producer Matt Carroll at this point, however, who asserted that Barry cold not act and instead cast Ed Devereaux, a choice which Ellis disapproved of, as he was too 'short' and 'fat' to play the 'tall' and 'thin' Chifley. In 2004, Barry would play Chifley in A Local Man, a one-man stage play co-written by Ellis.

The film hints that Chifley had an affair with his secretary, Phyllis Donnelly, even though Ellis does not believe it to be the case:

It's unbelievable to me that as dedicated a Catholic as Chifley would experiment with contraception and it's impossible for her not to have got pregnant if it had been on... [although] It's kind of written that way. "But it's written that way on the demand of the historians, who were riding the script like a man on four horses at once... They did not want to say or imply anything that could not be utterly proven before what they feared, I imagine, was a hanging judge. I don't know why they were so worried.

Ellis claims he wrote the script quickly, because he was focusing on the 2007 Australian Federal Election, "For fear that the time lost would lose Labor the election, because I was contributing - as it turned out minimally, but energetically - throughout to the lines said by the politicians and so on. So I wound up with about nine days in a winery and a house rule of no alcohol before 9pm."

Ellis says his main aim was to make the show "as close to the emotional reality of government" as possible and he wanted to depict:

That extraordinary generation of self-educated, working-class men who ran the country for a while. It was an unrepeatable era, really, when none of them had been to university, all of them had worked in a trade, and here they were in charge of armies and economies and so on. It was, as you might say, a noble experiment... It created the Australia we more or less know, which is the multicultural, well-educated, well-hospitalised, well-run, amiable democracy that it's been for a very long time. It created the Australia we had until about 1990, when they started to sell off Qantas and all these stupid things. It was an Australia people increasingly yearn for, I think.

== See also ==
- The True Believers, a drama based on the A.L.P. written by Bob Ellis, whose first choice to play Chifley was Tony Barry
- A Local Man, a one-man stage play co-written by Ellis and starring Barry as chifley
