= Bob Baines =

Australian actor

- Born: 15 November 1952 (age 73); Liverpool, England
- Occupation: Actor
- Years active: 1973–present

Bob Baines (born 15 November 1952) is an English-Australian actor. He has starred in many television shows including State Coroner opposite Wendy Hughes as Clive Trimble, Water Rats and Home and Away as school principal Martin Bartlett.

== Filmography ==
=== Film ===
| Year | Title | Role | Notes |
|---|---|---|---|
| 1979 | Dawn! | 12th Policeman | |
| 1986 | Twelfth Night | Priest | |
| 1988 | Evil Angels (aka A Cry in the Dark) | Chief Minister | |
| 1990 | Harbour Beat | Scottish Chef | |
| 1993 | No Worries | Tom Drew | |
| 1993 | The Custodian | Detective Inspector Blewitt | |
| 1994 | The Sum of Us | Greg's Father | |
| 1994 | Spider and Rose | Ambo Officer Muggleston | |
| 2000 | After the Rain | PJ Faulkner | |
| 2000 | Risk | Grayson | |
| 2005 | Deck Dogz | Headmaster Clatwell | |
| 2006 | Jindabyne | Doctor #1 | |
| 2006 | Alex's Party | Tony | Short film |
| 2006 | One Last Shot | Forensics Investigator | Short film |
| 2006 | Sorry... With a Fringe on Top! | Cliff | Short film |
| 2006 | Tight as a Drum | Dean Fowler | |
| 2007 | The Final Winter | Ned | |
| 2007 | September | Henry | |
| 2007 | U-Turn | Ted | Short film |
| 2010 | Uninhabited | Jackson | |
| 2011 | Colin the Dog's Fabulous Midnight Adventure and Another Story | Giles | Short film |

=== Television ===
| Year | Title | Role | Notes |
|---|---|---|---|
| 1979 | The Young Doctors | Policeman | 4 episodes |
| 1981 | Bellamy | Paul | Miniseries, 1 episode |
| 1982–1985 | Sons and Daughters | 3 roles | 15 episodes |
| 1983 | Prisoner | Plain Clothes Policeman | 1 episode |
| 1983 | Patrol Boat | Canberra Captain | 1 episode |
| 1983 | Scales of Justice | | Miniseries, 1 episode |
| 1984 | Special Squad | | Episode 4: "Easy Street" |
| 1984 | Crime of the Decade | | TV film |
| 1986 | The Movers | Marcus | TV film |
| 1987 | Black Beauty | Voice | Animated TV movie |
| 1987 | Rafferty's Rules | Geoffrey Walter | 1 episode |
| 1988 | The Dirtwater Dynasty | Navy Official | Miniseries, 1 episode |
| 1988 | Westward Ho! | Voice | Animated TV movie |
| 1988 | True Believers | Stan Keon | Miniseries, 5 episodes |
| 1988 | The Fremantle Conspiracy | | Miniseries |
| 1988 | The Black Arrow | Voice | Animated TV movie |
| 1988 | Hard Knuckle | Corbett | TV film |
| 1988 | A Country Practice | John Small | 2 episodes |
| 1988 | Emma: Queen of the South Seas | Mr Keegan | Miniseries, 2 episodes |
| 1989 | Malpractice | Doug Davis | Tv film |
| 1990 | The Paper Man | Barry Slater | Miniseries, 4 episodes |
| 1990 | The Flying Doctors | Ron Moore | 1 episode |
| 1990 | Elly & Jools | Sergeant Digges | Miniseries, 7 episodes |
| 1991 | Police Rescue | Frank Williams | Season 1, episode 13: "By the Book" |
| 1993 | Seven Deadly Sins | Ray | Miniseries, episode 3: "Sloth" |
| 1993 | The Leaving of Liverpool | Senior Brother | TV film |
| 1993 | Joh's Jury | Adrian Gundelach | Miniseries |
| 1993 | E Street | Harry | 2 episodes |
| 1994 | G.P. | Father Johnson | 1 episode |
| 1995 | The Ferals | Uncle Frank | 1 episode |
| 1995–2003 | Blue Heelers | Ian Hammond / Sergeant Barton | 2 episodes |
| 1997 | Murder Call | Max May | Season 1, episode 16: "Heartstopper" |
| 1997 | The Adventures of Sam | Voice | 1 episode |
| 1997–1998 | State Coroner | Deputy Coroner Clive Trimble | 28 episodes |
| 1998 | Meteorites! | Phillip | TV film |
| 1999 | Wildside | Neil Addison | 1 episode |
| 2000 | Water Rats | Hugh Costello | 1 episode |
| 2001 | Outriders | Bruce | 4 episodes |
| 2001–2002 | BackBerner | Spokesperson for Liberal Party / Spokesperson for Labor Party | |
| 2001–2005 | All Saints | Phil Harper / Bill Pedersen | 3 episodes |
| 2003 | MDA | Murray Trench | 2 episodes |
| 2008–2010 | Home and Away | Martin Bartlett | 207 episodes |
| 2010 | I, Spry | Bob Wake | TV film |
| 2011 | Laid | Andrew's Dad | 2 episodes |
| 2011 | Crownies | Dr. Wally Kos | 1 episode |
| 2012 | Rake | Judge Robbo | Season 2, episode 3: "R vs Wooldridge & Anor" |
| 2012–2013 | Redfern Now | Supt Giles / Inspector Giles | 2 episodes |
| 2015 | The Dalfram Dispute 1938: Pig Iron Bob | Robert Menzies during the Dalfram dispute of 1938 | Documentary film |
| 2017 | House of Bond | RPYC Commodore | 2 episodes |

== Theatre ==
=== As actor ===
| Year | Title | Role | Notes |
|---|---|---|---|
| 1973 | A Season of Japanese Noh Plays / The Damask Drum / The Lady Aoi / Sotoba Komachi | | Theatre 62, Adelaide |
| 1976 | The Changing Room | Trevor | New Theatre, Sydney |
| 1977 | The Naked Hamlet | Norwegian Captain / Polonius | The Actors Company Theatre |
| 1977 | Rosencrantz and Guildenstern Are Dead | Polonius | The Actors Company Theatre |
| 1978; 1982 | The Rocky Horror Show | The Narrator | Wagga Wagga Civic Theatre with Riverina Trucking Co |
| 1978 | The Club | Jock | Wagga Wagga Civic Theatre with Riverina Trucking Co |
| 1978 | John, Paul, George, Ringo... and Bert | Alan Klein & other roles | Wagga Wagga Civic Theatre with Riverina Trucking Co |
| 1980 | Don't Just Lie There, Say Something! | Barry Ovis | Bankstown Town Hall, Sydney with Q Theatre Co |
| 1980 | The Threepenny Opera | Macheath | Civic Playhouse, Newcastle with Hunter Valley Theatre Co |
| 1981 | West | Syd / Curly | Riverina College of Advanced Education with Riverina Trucking Co |
| 1982 | Ned Kelly | Hare / Mrs Jones | North Qld tour with New Moon Theatre |
| 1982 | Macbeth | Duncan / Siward | North Qld tour with New Moon Theatre |
| 1982 | Tommy | Uncle Ernie | New Moon Theatre |
| 1982 | No Orchids for Miss Blanchard | Fenner / Riley | New Moon Theatre |
| | Royal Show | Fox / Sir Sydney Truscott | New Moon Theatre |
| | Cabaret | Herr Schultz | New Moon Theatre |
| | A Midsummer Night’s Dream | Peter Quince / Demetrius | New Moon Theatre |
| 1983 | Life on Mars – Rock Review | | New Moon Theatre |
| 1983 | Buffaloes Can't Fly | Reg Hargreave | Nimrod Theatre Company |
| 1984 | Clay | | Q Theatre Co |
| 1985 | Entertaining Mr Sloane | Kemp | Playhouse, Adelaide with STCSA |
| 1985; 1986 | Bouncers | Lucky Eric | Seymour Centre, Sydney, Universal Theatre, Melbourne with Davis Morley Productions |
| 1986; 1987 | Are You Lonesome Tonight | Colonel Parker | Her Majesty's Theatre, Sydney, Festival Theatre, Adelaide with Promcon |
| 1987 | Magpie's Nest | Warder Nye | Belvoir Street Theatre |
| 1988 | Blood Brothers | Narrator | Seymour Centre, Sydney with Morley Emanuel |
| 1988 | The Rocky Horror Show | Riff Raff | Australia & NZ tour with Wilton Morley |
| 1989 | Summer Rain | Barry Doyle | Sydney Opera House with STC |
| 1989; 1990 | The Rover | Blunt | Playhouse, Adelaide, Seymour Centre, Sydney with STCSA & Sydney Festival |
| 1990 | Moby Dick—Rehearsed | The Old Pro | Marian Street Theatre, Sydney, Suncorp Theatre, Brisbane with RQTC |
| 1992 | Cosi | Henry | Belvoir Street Theatre |
| 1993 | Reflected Glory | Alfred | Ensemble Theatre |
| 1993; 1994 | The Rise and Fall of Little Voice | Mr Boo / Phoneman | Wharf Theatre, Sydney with STC |
| 1995 | Sydney Stories 2: The Blessing / Two Wongs / In the Club / The Way I Was | Various | Wharf Theatre, Sydney with STC for Sydney Festival |
| 1995 | Saint Joan | Stogumber / Courtier | Sydney Opera House with STC |
| 1996 | Lift off Live | | Sydney Opera House with Sydney Festival |
| 1999–2001 | Life Support | J.G. | Australian tour with Ensemble Theatre |
| 2000 | Equus | Frank Strang | State Theatre, Sydney |
| 2001 | Life After George | Duffy | MTC |
| 2006 | Capricornia | Oscar and Mark Shillingsworth | Seymour Centre, Sydney with Company B |
| 2007 | Othello | Brabantio | The Playhouse, Canberra, Playhouse, Melbourne, Sydney Opera House, Orange Civic Theatre with Bell Shakespeare |
| 2010 | Engine | Grumpop | NORPA |
| 2011 | Rope | Sir Johnstone Kentley | Bondi Pavilion, Sydney with Tamarama Rock Surfers |
| 2014; 2015 | Strictly Ballroom – The Musical | Les Kendall | Sydney Lyric Theatre, Her Majesty's Theatre, Melbourne, Lyric Theatre, Brisbane with Global Creatures |
| 2018 | The Lost Tangerine Jacket | Barman / Sergeant / Board Member 3 / Big Jim Anderson / Hatchet Man 1 / Newspaper Shop Man | Riverside Theatres Parramatta |
| | The Depression Darling | Charles Rubira | Music Box Theatre |
| | Twelfth Night | Sea Captain / Priest | STCSA |
| | The Dumb Waiter | | Off Broadway |

=== As crew ===
| Year | Title | Role | Notes |
|---|---|---|---|
| 1978 | The Removalists | Set/Property Maker | Riverina Trucking Co |
