= The True Believers =

- Promotional poster
- Genre: Historical drama
- Written by: Bob Ellis; Stephen Ramsay (Note: John Lonie performed rewrites on the script uncredited.)
- Directed by: Peter Fisk
- Starring: Ed Devereaux; Simon Chilvers; John Bonney
- Theme music composer: Gustav Holst
- Opening theme: Jupiter, the Bringer of Jollity
- Composer: William Motzing
- Country of origin: Australia
- Original language: English
- No. of episodes: 8

Production
- Executive producers: Matt Carroll; Sandra Levy
- Producer: Stephen O'Rourke (Note: Producer and line producer)
- Editor: Graham Tickle
- Camera setup: Peter Robson; Murray Tokin; Richard Bond; Tony Connolly; Glenn Traynor
- Running time: 440 minutes
- Production companies: ABC-TV; Roadshow; Coote & Carroll
- Budget: $3.6 million

Original release
- Network: ABC
- Release: 28 June – 16 August 1988

The True Believers is a 1988 Australian historical drama miniseries directed by Peter Fisk and written by Bob Ellis and Stephen Ramsay. The series looks at the history of the Australian Labor Party from the end of World War II up to the Australian Labor Party split of 1955.

It was co-written by Bob Ellis who focused on three characters "Chifley, the unlettered man of great dignity; Menzies, who used to stand for something but eventually stood only for Menzies; and Evatt, the grand idealist... It's almost like Shakespeare's Henry IV, Part 1. It's a chunk of national history during Australia's great era of change after the war."

== Cast ==
- Ed Devereaux as Ben Chifley (Note: Attributed to multiple references:)
- John Bonney as Robert Menzies (Note: Attributed to multiple references:)
- Simon Chilvers as H. V. Evatt (Note: Attributed to multiple references:)
- Nick Tate as Les Haylen
- Ray Meagher as Tom Burke
- Harold Hopkins as Edgar Ross
- Graham Rouse as Arthur Fadden
- Gary Files as Fred Daly
- John Derum as B. A. Santamaria
- Tracy Mann as Tess Ross
- Ron Blanchard as Arthur Calwell
- Bryan Marshall as Richard Casey
- Bob Baines as Stan Keon
- Rob Steele as Clyde Cameron
- Danny Adcock as Lloyd Ross
- Diane Craig as Elsie
- Valerie Bader as Mary Alice Evatt
- Jeff Ashby as Garfield Barwick
- John Ewart as Eddie Ward
- Joan Bruce as Pattie Menzies
- Malcolm Robertson as Idris Williams
- Max Phipps as Sir Frank Packer
- Norman Kaye as Archbishop Daniel Mannix
- Stuart McCreery as Allan Dalziel
- Scott McGregor as Jim Comerford
- Alastair Duncan as Sir William Owen
- Hec McMillan as William McKell
- Edwin Hodgeman as Radio Actor
- Jerome Ehlers
- Gary Waddell

== Production ==
Bob Ellis initially conceived of a series entitled The True Believers, which would have followed the English Labour Party leaders from Keir Hardie to Harold Wilson. Ellis eventually pivoted to telling the story of the Australian Labor Party in a film and pitched it to Matt Carroll at the Ten network. Carroll commissioned Ellis and Stephen Ramsey to write it, originally as a feature film, and Ellis re-used the title The True Believers. Initially, this was announced as a working title, but it would remain throughout production and become the final one. In October 1984 Ten announced they did not want to make it in order to pivot towards entertainment programming. Ellis and Ramsey spent four or five weeks researching the project. Ellis would later in life comment that Ramsey 'did much more work than me'. The two invented a character named Joanna Malcolm for 'gender balance'. While researching, they spoke with Clyde Cameron, whose 'photographic memory for dialogue' and stories informed much of the dialogue. They also met with members of the Liberal Party of Australia, such as John Carrick and Billy McMahon. Ellis and Ramsey, wishing to pay respect to Ben Chifley, wrote part of the script in his kitchen, "soaking up the atmosphere". Ellis's first choice for director was Michael Jenkins, but he was edged out of it by Peter Fisk, who he described as an "office politician". Ellis wanted Tony Barry to play Chifley. He introduced him to Hec McMillan, who had worked for Chifley, who commented '[t]ake about five pounds off him and he’s perfect.' The script was in Carroll's hands at this point, however, who asserted that Barry could not act (Note: Barry would later portray Chifley in Ellis's one-man stage play A Local Man and his documentary and re-enactment Infamous Victory: Ben Chifley's Battle for Coal.) and cast Ed Devereaux instead. Ellis disapproved of the casting of the 'short, fat' Ed Devereaux as the 'tall, thin' Chifley and the 'tall, thin' Simon Chilvers as the 'short, fat' Doc Evatt.

The producers of The Petrov Affair reportedly tried to buy part of the script, but were turned down. Carroll took the project to Sandra Levy at the ABC and she agreed to make it provided it was done on videotape. If it was shot on film the estimated cost would be $5.6 million but on video it could be done for $3.4 million. It would be shown on the ABC for the Bicentenary. Having transitioned from a film to a series on videotape, the project needed to be rewritten. When Ellis and Ramsay refused, John Lonie rewrote the scripts and, being a historian, corrected a number of inaccuracies which Ellis had included. Ellis refused to watch the series due to the omitting of Chifley's mistress (which he likened to leaving Cleopatra out of a Mark Antony biography) (Note: By 2008, Ellis no longer believed that the relationship between Phyllis Donnelly and Chifley was sexual, as it would have resulted in a pregnancy and, given that Chifley was a Catholic, it was 'unlikely' that he would use contraception.) and Doc Evatt's 'clinical insanity', the minimising of the Petrov Affair, and more.

Filming took place in October 1987. On the 25th, Devereaux and Bonney filmed a scene at Old Parliament House, Canberra.

== Soundtrack ==
New York Classical Players and the United States Air Force Band playing Jupiter, the Bringer of Jollity
Bill Motzing used Jupiter, the Bringer of Jollity, the fourth movement from Gustav Holst's suite The Planets, to score the main titles

William Motzing composed the music for the series. He got the role as he had previously worked with an arranger that executive producer Matt Carroll had collaborated with on a couple of projects. Motzing composed all the incidental music. For the main title theme, he found the piece Jupiter, the Bringer of Jollity, the fourth movement from Gustav Holst's suite The Planets, to be so appropriate that he doubted he could do any better. Carroll agreed and the piece was used.

== Reception ==
=== Critical reception ===
Ian Warden for The Canberra Times believed that "the real" Ben Chifley was "too sweet and straight to have a third dimension" in the series. He said that Ed Devereaux looked the part and "smokes a pipe with authority" but was otherwise unconvincing. Warden was called John Bonney's performance as Robert Menzies more convincing. He criticised the series for the "immature" decision to make the actors imitate the people "rather than to simply act the roles of characters and to attend to making the events authentic." and remarked that Devereaux, Bonney and Simon Chilvers as Doc Evatt were all doing "Max Gillies impression[s]". He argued that "[t]he jobs should always go to actors good enough to make us believe in what the characters are doing and saying and not to those actors whose best qualification is that they bear a passing physical resemblance to the character in question." He later called the series "laughable".

David Vine for The Canberra Times wrote that there was "much to be admired in the series," as it was "clearly the product of a prodigious research effort" and the interpolation of contemporary news footage to handle key plot developments was "skilful." He praised the performances across the large cast as consistently "high calibre" and the dialogue as "sharply observed with the sort of natural feel to it that belies the talent and hard work required to produce it." He said that, though some of the protagonists on the conservative side were little more than caricatures (claiming that Robert Menzies was depicted as "as little better than a manipulative pompous fraud"), owing to the "blatant[...] partisan[ship" of the series, the characters on the left were "drawn sparsely but believably". Though Vine understood it was probably the reason for the low ratings and accusations of being "dull[and] ponderous", he praised the series for resisting the temptation to add wildly irrelevant aspects to the private lives of the characters to make it "accessible". Overall, he called the series a "considerable success". He later called Simon Chilvers' performance as Doc Evatt "excellent", while Janne D. Graham, for the same newspaper, saw it as a "caricature impression".

Frank Bongiorno was "entertained and informed, amid quite a few laugh-out loud moments." He wrote that Chifley was portrayed as "salt-of-the-earth, the kind of bloke everyone would want as their uncle", Doc Evatt as "brilliant, thrusting and unstable, child-like rather than villainous", Robert Menzies as "appropriately ruthless", but "not without sensitivity or principle, though neither can outdo his opportunism." and Bob Santamaria as "a zealot with mad eyes who seems more like a dangerous cult leader than the amiable fellow of later times[...] on his Sunday morning TV program Point of View." Peter Craven called the script "exceptionally eloquent and uncompromising" and said that the series would "remind you of a history you half-know or instruct you in one you are blind to". He praised the series' performances, remarking that Devereaux "captures all of Chifley’s decency" and Chilvers "everything that’s delusional about Evatt’s brilliance". He called Bonney's Menzies "instantly recognisable" but noted that "sometimes the conservatives speak in the Malvolio voices of people imitating a class higher than their own just as the Laborites can sound like rabble phonetically re-assembled by a mob of luvvies." He claimed there were multiple "tearjerking moments" done "movingly and powerfully", such as Chifley praying in the Catholic church he feels has rejected him, and Menzies hearing of Chifley’s death, whispering the news to Evatt and closing the winter ball.

James Walter for Cinema Papers wrote that the series makes an attempt to deliver the complex ideas of 50s Australia to a general audience but is ultimately unsuccessful, working better as a narrative and melodrama. He remarked that, 'in reaching for an epic quality, it neglects some of the more interesting human characteristics of its protagonists and so underrates all but the "heroes"'. He praised the screenwriters for their use of dramatic conventions and creating a workable script out of the mountainous material available, but claimed that, while they got the 'lineaments' of the narrative corrected, the dramatic changes were poor. His main, overarching criticism was that it failed to give insight into the 'many-sided nature of the events which shaped our recent history'. He criticised the series for presenting a one-sided view on the 1949 Australian coal strike. He argued presented Chifley as having no choice but to deploy troops against the striking miners, and failing to present the alternative viewpoint presented by other parties, such as Edgar Ross himself, that the union leadership had tried to prevent the strike by offering terms to the government which Chifley refused because his end was to 'break the power of the Communist executive.' He, too, aimed criticisim at the depiction of Ross as 'an unthinking extremist agitator, speaking only in slogans, and sacrificing everything to his fanaticism', and argued that changing the ages of Ross's children in an effort to 'enhance the supposed danger to which their father's political extremism exposed them' was a 'stock' and 'melodramatic' effort to 'evoke a knee-jerk response from the audience'. Additionally, Walter criticised the series' interpretation of Chifley as a whole, arguing that it 'fail[s] to show him as a tactician and ready to engage in "combat politics"' depicts saintly and reactive, diminishing his strength as a politician and the strength of the A.L.P.. He argued that the series emphasised ideology over content and therefore missed the core of the A.L.P. at the time: having a philosophy as well as a program, the evidence for which, he argued, could be seen in the White Paper on Full Employment in Australia. Walters believed that the series took the easy way out with Robert Menzies, 'showing him as an oily and pragmatic opportunist, who justifies his ploys to himself as "just politics" while pontificating to Pattie at home about being a truly moral man.' He argued that, to imply Menzies was no more than a scheming tactician, was 'tak[ing] the easy way out', and that presenting Menzies as no more than a foil to the A.L.P. was underestimating him. Walter, too, claimed that the series only presented the 'cantankerous, irascible individualist with a messianic belief in his destiny as leader of the ALP' side of Doc Evatt, which, while presenting accurate elements of his personality, omitted those which made him a more 'complex' and 'gifted' man than the series depicted and reduced his 'agonies to the lineaments of "the battler"'. He criticised the series for depicting women as merely supporters of strong men, wives and secretaries, citing Elizabeth Chifley, Pattie Menzies, Mary Alice Evatt, Tess Ross and Chifley's fictional secretary Elsie as examples. He claimed that the series uses them as confidantes for the men to explain their strategy and motives to, and therefore to the audience, as well as depicting them as 'capable of penetrating vainglory and bluster to speak for common sense', and reinforcing the danger and emotional ramifications of their actions. Despite his criticism of the writing, Walter called the central cast (Devereaux, Bonney, Chilvers, Blanchard, Files, Tate and Rouse) 'uniformly strong[...] within the constraints of the script'.

Jim McClelland said "while I am prepared to concede that I may be an atypically political animal I have to report that I experienced not a moment of boredom in watching the eight hour mini-series... It pulls off that rare double-historical accuracy and rivetting entertainment." McClelland also noted that Bonney's performance as Menzies was a natural choice, as Bonney looked like Menzies. Paul Keating told Ellis that he held the series 'high in his heart'.

Max Burr was 'disgusted' at the depiction of an 'arrogant, aloof, uncaring' Menzies and not the 'great Australian which he was.' David Hamer called the series 'blatant Labor Party propaganda' which was 'a gross distortion of history and insulting to the characters of most of the politicians identified, with the one glaring exception of Mr Chifley'. Robert Ray watched the series and disagreed.

=== Reception from parties depicted ===
Fred Daly watched the show and called it "an excellent production." He said "the bloke playing Chifley hasn't got the voice right but then nobody could get Chif's voice right." As to the actor Gary Files who had played Daly, the real Daly made no comment of this portrayal of himself.

At the book launch of These Things Shall Be at the University of Sydney on 25 July 1988, Edgar Ross had "something to say in rebuttal" of The True Believers.

Jim Comerford criticised the series for, 'whether inten[tionally] or not', acting as a 'major vehicle to represent the left, not that the left was innocent of some blame or errors'. He claimed that the series 'carried an aggregation of caricatures' and called the portrayal of himself inaccurate, as it painted him as 'some kind of innocent abroad, constantly manipulated by Idris Williams and Edgar Ross' and depicted him drinking beer, despite the fact that he did not consume any kind of alcohol.

Heather Henderson, daughter of Robert Menzies, was "outraged" by the program and wondered how the ABC could screen something "which completely misrepresents so many people, particularly my father, Sir Robert Menzies". She called the portrayal of Menzies a "smirking", "pompous, arrogant, conniving, phoney" and drew attention to a letter John Curtin wrote to her father, where he spoke of "the consideration and courtesy which never once failed in [Robert's] dealings with [him]." Henderson said that her 'children who remember their grandfather are deeply hurt" and claimed that the depiction of Pattie Menzies was 'nothing like the sparkling character I knew'.

Fergan O'Sullivan, the press secretary to Doc Evatt, told Ellis that he thought the series got Evatt wrong, and 'was unfair in its portrait of this considerable, difficult, frustrating, stupendously energetic, brilliant, wayward man and to some others as well.'

=== Accolades ===
The True Believers was nominated for four Australian Film Institute Television Awards. It won Best mini-series for producers Sandra Levy and Matt Carrol, Best Achievement in Direction for Peter Frisk and Best Performance by an Actor in a Miniseries for Ed Devereaux.

Peter Knevitt won a Penguin Television Award for lighting.

== See also ==
- A Local Man, a one-man stage play co-written by Ellis, where Tony Barry plays Ben Chifley, who was Ellis's first choice for Chifley in The True Believers
- Infamous Victory: Ben Chifley's Battle for Coal, a documentary and re-enactment written by Bob Ellis where Barry plays Chifley
- Silver City, a film scored by William Motzing, where Ron Blanchard plays Arthur Calwell
- The Petrov Affair, a miniseries where Simon Chilvers plays Doc Evatt
