= Andrew Bibby (actor) =

Australian actor

- Born: 24 October 1980 (age 46); Sydney, Australia
- Occupation: Actor
- Years active: 1994–2010, 2018, 2022–2023
- Children: 3

Andrew Bibby (born 24 October 1980) is an Australian former actor, known for playing Lance Wilkinson in the soap opera Neighbours.

== Early life ==
Bibby was born to Jill, a child care worker, and Ross, a draughtsman. He has a younger brother, Daniel. He grew up in the Melbourne suburbs. He went to Maranatha Christian School in Endeavour Hills, Melbourne, Victoria. After being accepted to both NIDA and WAAPA, he moved to Perth and studied acting at WAAPA between 2001 and 2003.

Bibby wanted to be an actor from a young age and acquired an agent when he was 10 years old. He secured his first professional role when he was 13 years old in an educational film.

== Acting career ==
In 1994, Bibby appeared in the Melbourne Theatre Company's production of The Grapes of Wrath alongside Anne Phelan, Robert Menzies, and Jeremy Sims. That same year, Bibby had guest appearances in A Country Practice and Blue Heelers.

After meeting with casting director Jan Russ, Bibby won the occasional role of Lance Hails in the television soap opera Neighbours. A year later, he was asked to audition for the part of Jon Wilkinson, but when he was cast, producers changed the character to Lance and introduced his on-screen family. Bibby decided to leave the show in 2001. He reprised the role in 2018, and 2022.

In 1996 he appeared in the Australian romantic comedy film, Hotel de Love, alongside Aden Young, Saffron Burrows and Simon Bossell.

Bibby worked for the Bell Shakespeare company in 2004 and also featured in several advertisements including the Zoo Weekly ad, and has previously been on the St.George Bank ad. In 2005 he performed in the play, The Fire Raisers at the Old Fitzroy Theatre. Bibby featured in the 2007 Australian short film, DisPretty, by Stephanine Bates.

In August 2008, Bibby played the role of Fairbanks for the Australian premiere of the one man show Radio by Al Smith at the Old Fitzroy Theatre. He played the principal role in Ross Mueller's No Man's Island (2–27 June 2009) directed by Travis Green and Barnum in the Australian premiere of How to Act Around Cops by Logan Brown and Matthew Benjamin at the Darlinghurst Theatre, directed by Leland Kean.

In 2010, he appeared in the ABC kids series My Place, and had a recurring role in Underbelly: The Golden Mile as Detective Senior Constable Greg Locke.

Bibby is a founding member and associate artist of Shaman Productions, based in Sydney.

== Personal life ==
After leaving acting, Bibby became a Paramedic based at the Paddington Ambulance Station in Sydney. He later became NSW Ambulance's acting inspector. In 2025, Bibby appeared on a segment of 10 News First discussing a patient who was involved in a shark attack at Gunyah Beach.

He has three children.

== Filmography ==
Year	Title	Role	Notes
1994	A Country Practice	Jeremy Lalor	Episode: "Indiscreet"
1994	Blue Heelers	Jason	Episode: "Old Dogs, New Tricks"
1994	Computer Kids		TV movie
1995	Ocean Girl	Steve	Episode: "The Institute"
1995–2001, 2005, 2018, 2022	Neighbours	Lance Wilkinson / Lance Hails	Series regular
1996	Hotel de Love	Matt	Feature film
2007	DisPretty	Chris	Short film
2008	All Saints	Tony Clark	Episode: "Solitary Confinement"
2009	My Place	Mr McGrath	Episode: "Lily 1988"
2010	Underbelly: The Golden Mile	Greg Locke	Recurring

== Theatre ==
Year	Title	Role	Venue / Co.
1994	The Grapes of Wrath	Winfield Joad (child)	Playhouse, Melbourne with MTC
2000–01	Dick Whittington and His Amazing Cat	Dick Whittington	Gatehouse Theatre, Stafford, UK
2001–02	Cinderella	Prince Charming	Gatehouse Theatre, Stafford, UK
2005	The Fire Raisers	Firefighting chorus member	Old Fitzroy Theatre with Flyby Productions
2006	And in the End: The Life and Death of John Lennon	Gatekeeper of the White Light & various characters	NIDA Parade Theatre
2006	Below		Tap Gallery
2007	Upon the King's Urging		Seymour Centre with Ground Up Theatre
2007	The Last Great Roadhouse in Paradise		Old Fitzroy Theatre with Tamarama Rock Surfers
2008	Radio	Fairbanks	Old Fitzroy Theatre with Tamarama Rock Surfers
2009	No Man's Island	Rob	Old Fitzroy Theatre with Shaman Productions
2009	How to Act Around Cops	Barnum	Darlinghurst Theatre with Shaman Productions

=== As crew ===
Year	Title	Role	Notes
2007	Love and Money	Producer	Old Fitzroy Theatre with Shaman Productions
2019	Packer & Sons	Paramedic consultant	Belvoir Street Theatre
