= Ruth Cracknell =

Australian actress (1925–2002)

Ruth Cracknell AM
- Born: Ruth Winifred Cracknell; 6 July 1925; Maitland, New South Wales, Australia
- Died: 13 May 2002 (aged 76); Sydney, New South Wales, Australia
- Occupations: Actress, author, comedian
- Years active: 1945–2002
- Spouse: Eric Phillips†
- Children: 3

Ruth Winifred Cracknell AM (6 July 1925 – 13 May 2002) was an Australian character and comic actress, comedian and author. Her career encompassed all genres, including radio, theatre, television, and film. She appeared in many dramatic as well as comedy roles throughout a career spanning some 56 years. In theatre she was well known for her Shakespearean roles.

== Early life and education ==
Ruth Winifred Cracknell was born on 6 July 1925 in Maitland, New South Wales to Charles Cracknell and Winifred Goddard (nee Watts). When she was four years old, the family moved to Sydney. She was educated at North Sydney Girls High School and, after graduating, worked at the Ku-ring-gai Council as a stenographer.

In 1943 she joined the Modern Theatre Players drama school, run by Edna Spilsbury. She resigned from the council in 1945 to become a professional actress.

== Career ==
=== Radio and theatre ===
Cracknell's first acting jobs were in radio, starting at AWA recording studios in 1945. By 1946, she was performing five episodes of radio plays a week. She also performed on stage with the Sydney-based companies the Independent Theatre and the Mercury Theatre. In 1948, she joined the John Alden Company and had roles in King Lear, Measure for Measure and The Tempest.

In 1952, at the age of 27, she left Australia to work in London for two years.

=== Screen ===
Cracknell appeared in many TV serial productions, and made-for-TV films. One of her first roles was Reflections in Dark Glasses, a one-off drama broadcast in 1960. She was a hostess of children television series Play School in the mid to late 1960s. She also played Martha in the 1973 award-winning ABC-TV dramatisation of Ethel Turner's Australian children's classic Seven Little Australians. In the 1980s she guest starred in A Country Practice.

Cracknell is best known for her role in the ABC television series Mother and Son. Written by Geoffrey Atherden, who previously had written for The Aunty Jack Show, the series was based on the writer's own family experience. Mother and Son first screened on 16 January 1984; it continued for six seasons for over a decade and is often repeated. Cracknell played an elderly woman, Maggie Beare, who was slowly becoming senile. She was cared for by her long-suffering younger son Arthur (Garry McDonald), to whom she was often indifferent but on whom she was also dependent and whom she often cynically played off against her self-centred older son Robert (Henri Szeps) and daughter-in-law Liz (played by Judy Morris).

Cracknell appeared in film productions including opposite Chips Rafferty in the 1958 classic Smiley Gets a Gun, The Chant of Jimmie Blacksmith (1978), the 1983 The Night the Prowler (1978), and The Dismissal (1983) as Margaret Whitlam. Later in 1996, she starred with Toni Collette in Lilian's Story as Sydney eccentric Beatrice Miles.

=== Theatre companies ===
Cracknell acted for most of the major Australian theatre companies, especially the Sydney Theatre Company. She performed many different roles; Elaine in David Williamson's Emerald City (1987), Grandma Kurnitz in Lost in Yonkers (1992), and Shafer's Lettice and Lovage.

Her best-known role was in the stage production of The Importance of Being Earnest as Lady Bracknell. The production was so popular that it was an "ongoing" stage production from 1988 to 1992 and was televised by the ABC. She was also Patron of the Australian Theatre for Young People.

== Personal life and memoirs ==
Cracknell married Eric Phillips in 1957 and they had three children. Phillips was an engineer.

In 1997 Cracknell published her autobiography, A Biased Memoir, which was a bestseller in Australia. In 2000 she published her memoir, Journey from Venice, which related how she and her husband, Eric Phillips, were visiting Venice when he had a paralysing stroke. She did not speak a word of Italian but she had to organise medical treatment for him and have him returned to Australia in the face of significant obstacles. He later died in a Sydney hospital.

Cracknell died of a respiratory illness in a Sydney nursing home on 13 May 2002, aged 76. Her children had visited her a short time before.

== Honours and awards ==
In the 1980 Australia Day Honours, Cracknell was appointed a Member of the Order of Australia (AM), "in recognition of service to the performing arts".

She received honorary doctorates from the University of Sydney (1985) and the Queensland University of Technology (1995).

In 1995, Cracknell received a lifetime achievement award at the Glugs Theatrical Awards in Sydney.

In 1998, the National Trust of Australia named her one of "100 National Living Treasures".

=== ARIA Music Awards ===
The ARIA Music Awards is an annual awards ceremony that recognises excellence, innovation, and achievement across all genres of Australian music.

Year	Nominated works	Award	Result
1992	Paul Gallico's The Snow Goose	Best Children's Album	Nominated

=== Helpmann Awards ===
The Helpmann Awards is an awards show, celebrating live entertainment and performing arts in Australia, presented by industry group Live Performance Australia (LPA) since 2001. In 2001, Cracknell received the JC Williamson Award, the LPA's highest honour, for their life's work in live performance.

Year	Nominee / work	Award	Result
2001	Herself	JC Williamson Award	awarded

=== Logie Awards ===
In 2001, Cracknell was awarded the TV Week Logie Hall of Fame for her services to Australian television. Her appearance at the ceremony was the last in public before her death. She was the first (and for 15 years, the only) woman to be inducted.

Year	Nominee / work	Award	Result (wins only)
1993	Herself	Most Outstanding Actress	Won
1994	Herself	Most Outstanding Actress	Won
1994	Herself	Most Popular Comedy Personality	Won
2001	Herself	Logie Hall of Fame	awarded

== Filmography ==
=== Film ===
Year	Title	Role	Type
1958	Smiley Gets a Gun	Mrs. Gaspen	Feature film
1960	Reflections in Dark Glasses	Psychiatrist	TV film
1969	That Lady from Peking	Fortune Teller	Feature film (released 1975)
1976	The Singer and the Dancer	Mrs. Bilson	Film short
1978	The Chant of Jimmie Blacksmith	Mrs. Heather Newby	Feature film
1978	The Night the Prowler	Doris Bannister	Feature film
1982	The Best of Friends	Iris	Feature film
1982	Island Trader	Victoria	TV film
1983	Molly	Mrs. Reach	Feature film
1988	Emerald City	Elaine Ross	Feature film
1989	Kokoda Crescent	Alice	Feature film
1989	Kakadu Man	Narrator	Film documentary
1993	Tale of a Lampshade	Narrator	Film short
1994	Spider and Rose	Rose Dougherty	Feature film
1996	Lilian's Story	Lilian Singer	Feature film
1997	Joey	Sylvia	Feature film
2004	The Scree	Narrator (voice)	Film short

=== Television ===
Year	Title	Role	Type
1960-61	Ruth Cracknell	Herself	TV series
1962	The Patriots		TV miniseries, 10 episodes
1963	Smugglers Beware		TV series, 4 episodes
1964	Split Level	Alison	Teleplay
1965	The Mavis Bramston Show	Guest - Herself	TV series, 1 episode
1965	TV Spells Magic	Guest - Herself with Max Meldrum, Ron Shand, Evie Hayes, Wendy Blacklock, David Copping, Kevin Miles, Gwen Plumb, Chips Rafferty & Keith Petersen	TV special
1965	Moment of Truth	Sister Kenny	TV series, 1 episode
1966	Australian Playhouse	Miss Peach	TV series, 1 episode: "The Lace Counter"
1967	Nice 'n Juicy		TV series, 1 episode
1967	Bellbird		TV series
1967	I'm Alright Now	Herself	TV series, 1 episode
1968	Fiends of the Family	Maggie	Teleplay
1969	I've Married A Bachelor		TV series, 1 episode
1969	Tilley Landed On Our Shore	Tilley	Teleplay
1969	Play School	Presenter	TV series, 4 episodes
1969	Sex and the Australian Male	Herself	TV special
1969	The Rovers	The Postmistress	TV series, 1 episode
1970	Dynasty	Biddy	TV series, 1 episode
1970	Chequerboard	Jocasta	TV series, 1 episode
1970	The Long Arm	Mrs. Stevens	TV series, 1 episode 1: "The Lion Was First To Know"
1971	Dead Men Running		TV miniseries, 6 episodes
1971	Mrs Finnegan	Mrs. Evans	TV series, 1 episode
1971	John Bluthal	Herself	TV special
1972	Carry On Spike in Australia	Herself	TV special
1972	The Cousin from Fiji		TV series, 1 episode
1972	Division 4	Mrs. Harris	TV series, 1 episode
1972	A Big Country	Herself	TV series, 1 episode: "The Long Distance Search"
1972	The Survivor		Teleplay
1972	The Man on the Ten Pound Note		Teleplay
1973	Catch Kandy	Gladys Evans	TV series, 1 episode
1973	Boney	Elizabeth Campbell	TV series, 1 episode
1973	Seven Little Australians	Martha	TV miniseries, 10 episodes
1974	Mac and Merle		TV pilot
1975	Ben Hall	Ma Walsh	TV series, 11 episodes
1975	The Last of the Australians		TV series, 1 episode
1977	Sammy Awards	Herself	TV special
1977	Young Ramsay	Hazel Barton	TV series, episode 7: "The Mystery of the Bora Hills"
1978	The Mike Walsh Show	Guest - Herself	TV series, 1 episode
1979	Golden Soak	Prophesy	TV miniseries, 6 episodes
1979	The Oracle		TV series, 1 episode
1982	Spring & Fall	Jessica Lambert	TV series, Season 2 episode 2: "Perfect Company"
1983-94	Mother and Son	Maggie Beare	TV series, 42 episodes
1983	The Dismissal	Margaret Whitlam	TV miniseries, 3 episodes
1984	A Country Practice	Maisie Davis	TV series, 2 episodes
1984	The Mike Walsh Show	Guest - Herself & Garry McDonald	TV series, 1 episode
1985	1985 Australian Film Institute Awards	Presenter	TV special
1986	Face of Australia	Herself	TV special
1986	The Nights Belong to the Novelist: Elizabeth Jolley, Australian Writer	Herself	TV special
1986	Alice to Nowhere	Mrs. Spencer	TV miniseries, 2 episodes
1987	Butterfly Island		TV series, 1 episode
1988	Women on Women	Herself	TV special
1989	Down to Earth	Herself	TV special
1989	The Maitland and the Morpeth String Quartet	Narrator	TV documentary
1989	The Bert Newton Show	Guest - Herself	TV series, 1 episode
1990	The Importance Of Being Earnest	Lady Bracknell	Teleplay
1991	'Til Ten	Guest	TV series, 1 episode
1992	The World Tonight	Guest	TV series, 1 episode
1992	The 7.30 Report	Guest	TV series, 1 episode
1992	The Morning Show	Guest	TV series, 1 episode
1992	Photographers of Australia: Dupain, Sievers, Moore	Narrator	TV documentary
1992	In Sydney Today	Guest	TV series, 1 episode
1992	Sydney Theatre Company 1978-1988	Herself	Film documentary
1993	Tonight Live	Guest	TV series, 1 episode
1993-97	Good Morning Australia	Guest	TV series, 5 episodes
1993	World Series Debating	Herself	TV series, 1 episode
1993	Sydney Opera House Honours Television Gala	Herself	TV special
1993	Where Were You the Day President Kennedy Was Shot?	Herself	TV documentary
1994	60 Minutes	Herself	TV series, 1 episode
1994	Hey Hey It's Saturday	Guest	TV series, 1 episode
1994; 1995	Denton	Guest	TV series, 2 episodes
1994	Eleven A.M.	Guest	TV series, 1 episode
1994	Today	Guest	TV series, 1 episode
1994	A Current Affair	Herself	TV series, 1 episode
1994	Midday with Derryn Hinch	Herself (with Simon Bossell)	TV series, 1 episode
1994	The Movie Show	Herself	TV series, 1 episode
1994	It's Ruth	Herself	TV special
1994	The People's Choice Awards	Presenter	TV special
1995	Creative Spirits	Herself	TV series, episode: Tall Tales But True - David Williamson
1995	Today Tonight	Herself	TV series, 2 episodes
1995; 1996	Review	Guest Presenter	TV series, 2 episodes
1995	Ten News	Herself	TV series, 2 episodes
1995	The Web	Narrator	TV series
1995; 1997	This Is Your Life	Herself	TV series, 2 episodes
1996	Sale of the Century	Contestant	TV series, 1 episode: "Logies Super Challenge"
1996-1998	Midday with Kerri-Anne	Guest	TV series, 3 episodes
1996	Sunday Afternoon	Herself	TV series, 1 episode
1996	The 7:30 Report	Herself	TV series, 1 episode
1997	The 1997 Annual TV Week Logie Awards	Guest - Herself/Presenter	TV Special
1997	Frontier	Narrator	TV series, 3 episodes
1997	Sunday	Guest	TV series, 1 episode
1997	60 Minutes	Herself	TV series, 1 episode
1997	McFeast: Portrait Of A Power Pussy	Herself	TV special
1997	The Making of Joey	Herself	TV special
1997	Monday to Friday	Guest	TV series, 1 episode
1997	Today Tonight	Guest	TV series, 1 episode
1997	McFeast: Plastered and Legless	Guest	TV special
1998	Laws	Guest	TV series, 1 episode
1998	McFeast	Guest	TV series, 1 episode
1998	Australians	Herself	TV series, 1 episode
1998	Up Close and Personal	Herself	TV series
1998	Good News Week	Guest	TV series, 1 episode
2001	2001 TV Week Logie Awards	Logie Hall of Fame Inductee	TV special
2001	From Vaudeville to Video - A Salute to Australian Comedy	Herself	TV special
2002	Australian Story	Herself	TV series, 1 episode
