= The Socialist (Australian newspaper) =

Australian newspaper (1906–1923)

- An exponent of international socialism
- Type: Newspaper
- Format: Tabloid
- Owner: Victorian Socialist Party
- Founded: 1 April 1906; 119 years ago
- Ceased publication: 1 February 1923; 102 years ago
- Language: English
- Headquarters: Exhibition Street, Melbourne
- City: Melbourne, Victoria
- Country: Australia

The Socialist newspaper was first published on 2 April 1906 in Melbourne, Victoria, Australia, the mouthpiece of the Victorian Socialist Party, a Marxist political party in Australia. The party was formed in 1906, but considered a party in name only by 1932.

The newspaper concerned itself with worker rights as well as promoting the ideals and activities of the political party.

== Publication ==
It was available weekly on a Friday, of four pages, at the price of one penny. Some editions were of eight pages, and there were some special editions (such as the "Eight hour day"). Some initial editions were printed by J. Thom at the Sun Buildings, Melbourne, with the publisher being the trade unionist Tom Mann (1856–1941), at the Socialist Hall, 283 Elizabeth Street, Melbourne.

The early 1910s saw the newspaper printed by Fraser and Jenkinson of 343 Queens Street, Melbourne, published for the Reverend F. Sinclaire, for the Socialist Party of Victoria, Socialist Hall, 283 Elizabeth Street, Melbourne.

At some time the masthead became "An exponent of international socialism" then by 1919, "An exponent of international socialism and industrial unionism". Commencing 28 June 1918, The Socialist incorporated the Social Democrat newspaper of Sydney, New South Wales.

By the 1920s, subscriptions were two shillings (2/-) per quarter year, and eight shillings (8/-) annually.

The newspaper's final publication was 1 February 1923, by Fraser and Jenkinson of 343 Queens Street, Melbourne, at two pence an issue. It was published by Don Cameron (1878–1962) for the Socialist Party of Victoria, 184 Exhibition Street, Melbourne. The address was also home of the Socialist Bookshop.

== Archives ==
Copies of the newspaper are stored on Trove in digitised form by the National Library of Australia.

== See also ==
- List of newspapers in Australia
