= Hotel de Love =

- Directed by: Craig Rosenberg
- Screenplay by: Craig Rosenberg
- Produced by: Peter Heller; Greg Coote; Graham Burke; Michael Lake; David Parker; Alex Waislitz; Heloise Waislitz
- Starring: Aden Young; Saffron Burrows; Simon Bossell; Pippa Grandison; Ray Barrett; Julia Blake
- Cinematography: Stephen F. Windon
- Edited by: Bill Murphy
- Music by: Brett Rosenberg
- Production companies: Pratt Films; Village Roadshow Pictures
- Distributed by: Live Entertainment; Roadshow Entertainment
- Release dates: 12 September 1996 (T.I.F.F.); 19 December 1996 (Australia)
- Running time: 95 minutes
- Country: Australia
- Language: English
- Box office: $111,106 (USA); AU $943,903 (Australia)

Hotel de Love is a 1996 Australian film written and directed by Craig Rosenberg. It was released theatrically in the United States, Great Britain, Australia and select countries throughout Europe.

== Plot ==
Fraternal twin brothers meet a childhood crush at a rundown hotel and rediscover their love as they renew their competition for her affection.

== Principal cast ==
- Aden Young as Rick Dunne
- Saffron Burrows as Melissa Morrison
- Simon Bossell as Stephen Dunne
- Pippa Grandison as Allison Leigh
- Ray Barrett as Jack Dunne
- Julia Blake as Edith Dunne
- Peter O'Brien as Norman Carey
- Alan Hopgood as Ronnie
- Andrew Bibby as Matt

== Production ==
The film was the directorial debut of Craig Rosenberg, an Australian writer who had been making a living writing screenplays in Los Angeles. David Parker was producer. Rosenberg:

Working with David Parker was an absolute joy. He's so experienced; he has written, produced and shot feature movies. To have him as producer on my first feature was a remarkable luxury for me because, if I had a writing problem, I could throw it to him and say, 'What do you think about this? Read this page for me'. If I had some shooting problem I would say, 'What do you think about this?' as well as having him do his normal production responsibilities. So he was a real godsend. He was a dream and he's a lovely person and I think we've formed a long friendship out of the experience.

== Soundtrack ==
Hotel de Love

Soundtrack album by Various
- Released: 28 January 1997
- Genre: Soundtrack
- Length: 44:02
- Label: Milan Records

Professional ratings
Review scores
Source	Rating
Allmusic	3/5 stars

1. Get Down Tonight - KC and the Sunshine Band
2. Sooner or Later - The Grass Roots
3. I'm Not in Love - 10cc
4. In a Minor Key - Tim Finn
5. Reminiscing - Little River Band
6. Blue Moon Revisited (Song for Elvis) - Cowboy Junkies
7. Sway - Hotel de Love Band
8. Lost in Love - Air Supply
9. In Love With It All - Tim Finn
10. I Honestly Love You - Olivia Newton-John
11. I Hope I Never - Split Enz
12. Love Will Keep Us Together - The Brett Rosenberg Problem

== Critical reception ==
The film received mixed reviews.

Roger Ebert of the Chicago Sun-Times somewhat enjoyed the film, giving it 2 and 1/2 stars out of 4:

Hotel de Love is a pleasant and sometimes funny film, without being completely satisfying.

Stephen Holden of The New York Times called it an "enjoyably ditsy romantic comedy" and "an enlightened 1990's version of a French farce."

== See also ==
- Cinema of Australia

== Notes ==
- Hopgood, Fincina (December 1996). "The story and the script". Cinema Papers. p. 28-33.
