= The Singer and the Dancer =

- Directed by: Gillian Armstrong
- Written by: John Pleffer
- Based on: short story 'Old Mrs Bilson' by Alan Marshall
- Produced by: Gillian Armstrong
- Starring: Ruth Cracknell
- Cinematography: Russell Boyd
- Edited by: Nicholas Beauman
- Music by: Robert Murphy
- Distributed by: Columbia Pictures
- Release dates: June 1976 (premiere); April 1977
- Running time: 52 minutes
- Country: Australia
- Language: English
- Budget: AU$27,000 or $100,000

The Singer and the Dancer is a 1977 film directed by Gillian Armstrong and starring Ruth Cracknell and Elizabeth Crosby.

== Plot ==
Mrs Bilson is treated as a simple minded invalid by her family and periodically escapes to sit by the river and listen to the races. She befriends Charlie, a young woman from the city who has come with her husband to seek a new life. Both realises they have much in common, including abusive and unfaithful husbands.

== Cast ==
- Ruth Cracknell as Mrs. Bilson
- Elizabeth Crosby as Charlie
- Russell Kiefel as Pete
- Jude Kuring as Mrs. Herbert
- Gerry Duggan as Doctor
- Kerry Walker as Rose Buckley

== Production ==
The film was the first long narrative movie from Gillian Armstrong, although she had made several shorts and a documentary. She had successfully adapted Alan Marshall stories at film school, and he sent her a copy of the story "Old Mrs Bilson" which she liked. Armstrong liked the central part of the story and the character of the woman, but she wanted to do something contemporary because her early short films, Gretel and One Hundred a Day had been set in the past. She asked Marshall if she could adapt it into a story where the woman character meets a young woman. Marshall agreed provided Armstrong write what the young woman would say:

And that's what we did. I came up with the characters who went to the country, Charley and a boyfriend, and we mingled that with the story that had always been there about Mrs Bilson. You find out about her past through the story.

Neva Carr Glynn was originally cast as the old lady but she died prior to production and Ruth Cracknell was given the role instead.

The film was shot over two weeks at Picton in October 1975, largely funded by the Film, Radio and Television Board of the Australia Council, who put in $20,000.

== Release ==
The Singer and the Dancer screened at the Sydney Film Festival in June 1976 and won the Greater Union Award for Best Narrative Film. Columbia agreed to distribute the film theatrically, with the Australian Film Commission paying for the movie to be blown up to 35mm. It also showed at some co-op screenings.
