= A Local Man =

2004 Australian play

A Local Man: A play about Ben Chifley
- Poster
- Original language: English
- Written by: Bob Ellis; Robin McLachlan
- Characters: Ben Chifley
- First publication: 2004
- Subject: Ben Chifley
- Genre: One-man play
- Setting: Bathurst, New South Wales

Premiere
- Date: 2004
- Place: Bathurst, New South Wales
- Directed by: Bill Blaikie

A Local Man: A play about Ben Chifley is a 2004 Australian one-man play by Bob Ellis and Robin McLachlan about Ben Chifley. It is a one man show.

== Plot ==
On June 9, 1951, Ben Chifley returns to his home in Bathurst, New South Wales to write a speech to deliver at the ALP Conference in Sydney the following day.

== Background ==
Ellis was long interested in the life and career of Ben Chifley. "Chifley is one of those great stories of massive disadvantage being overcome by discipline, intellect and a good deal of personal coldness, which is easily explicable by the fact that his mother let him go and he didn't see her for 10 years," Ellis said.

Ellis wrote the play for the actor Tony Barry, who he wanted to play Chifley in the mini series The True Believers, which the writer had co-authored, but, according to Ellis, "he was replaced by Ed Deveraux, a short fat man playing a tall thin man. It was like having Tony Perkins play Winston Churchill or Lou Costello play Charles de Gaulle. Then I thought: let's do a one-man show with Tony as Chifley."

Ellis collaborated with historian Robin McLachlan. The play was written in four sessions over 19 days. Ellis said "I didn't realise till then that the natural state of the Labor Party is one of six cats in a sack in the river. Their natural tendency is one of division, fratricide and self-abuse. But every now and then you get a great charismatic elucidating presence like Gough Whitlam and Bob Hawke who can hold the cats in the sack in some kind of communion."

The play debuted in Bathurst in 2004. Ellis said, "The effect of Tony as Chifley is astonishing. He doesn't exactly play the man himself but he plays to perfection the kind of 1930s and 1940s Australian man, sort of limited in his way but strong and absolutely uncorrupted, immovable in his principles. Tony has possibly the best Australian working-class voice. He had never been on stage until the year he first performed A Local Man. To get up to speed he played King Lear at the Bondi Pavilion."

It was picked up for production at the Ensemble Theatre in 2006. Ellis was surprised, claiming "The Ensemble's not exactly apolitical but it's very American — Neil Simon and Arthur Miller — and you don't see it do any original Australian plays that are not Henry Szeps discussing the joys of parenthood."

== See also ==
- The True Believers, a miniseries written by Bob Ellis, whose first choice for the part of Chifley was Tony Barry
- Infamous Victory: Ben Chifley's Battle for Coal, a documentary and re-enactment written by Bob Ellis where Tony Barry plays Chifley,
