= Joh's Jury =

- Written by: Ian David
- Directed by: Ken Cameron
- Starring: Simon Bossell; Penny Cook; Julie Hamilton; John Jarratt; Noah Taylor; Norman Yemm; Malcolm Kennard; John Howard; Rebecca Rigg; John Clayton; Graeme Blundell
- Country of origin: Australia
- Original language: English

Production
- Producer: Rod Allen
- Running time: 98 minutes
- Production companies: ABC; Southern Star Sullivan

Original release
- Network: ABC
- Release: 16 February 1993

Joh's Jury is a 1993 Australian television film about the perjury trial of Sir Joh Bjelke-Petersen.

== Cast ==
- Simon Bossell as Matthew
- Penny Cook as Penny
- Julie Hamilton as Thelma
- John Jarratt as Kev
- Noah Taylor as Brad
- Norman Yemm as Kevin
- Malcolm Kennard as Luke Shaw
- John Howard as Hedley
- Rebecca Rigg as Madonna
- John Clayton
- Graeme Blundell as Nicholas Cowdery
- John Sheerin as Dave
- John Clayton as Judge John Helman
- Betty Lucas as Evelyn
- Gerry Connolly as Joh Bjelke-Petersen
- Bob Baines as Adrian Gundelach
- Harold Hopkins as Geoffrey Woodward
