= Robert Samuel Ross =

Australian socialist journalist, trade unionist and agitator

Robert Samuel Ross (5 January 1873 – 24 September 1931) was an Australian socialist journalist, trade unionist, and agitator best known as the editor of a series of political magazines associated with the Australian labour movement in the 1890s and early 1900s.

Ross' militant journalism and agitation against Australia's involvement in World War I led to repression by the authorities. Ross' works during the war were censored and confiscated by the police and Ross faced multiple arrests for opposing conscription, waving the socialists' red flag, and circulating anti-war literature. His publication of the article "Bolshevism Has Broken Out in Heaven" led to a 1919 trial for blasphemy.

Ross' political views were drastically moderated during the 1920s. His contributions to Australian political life ended with his death as a respected member of the Australian Labor Party in 1931.

== Biography ==
The eldest of three sons born to Robert Mitchell Ross, a Scottish-born compositor, and Anne Matilda (née Bonham), Robert Mitchell's English-born wife, Robert Samuel Ross was born on 5 January 1873 in Sydney. The Ross family relocated to Queensland in 1885, where Robert Mitchell Ross found work as an editor. The younger Robert was educated at state schools, attended a Brisbane Baptist sunday school, and contributed to the family's finances by working as a messenger boy before became an apprentice compositor at seventeen. An precocious youth, he began working as a magazine editor at twenty, at first editing the sports magazine Queensland Cricketer & Footballer, later becoming editor of the Queensland Sportsman.

Politically involved by his early twenties, Ross was self-taught in the political dimension as a voracious reader of socialist and rationalist texts. An early influence on Ross' orientation in this respect was the writing of Australian labour movement pioneer William Lane, whose 1890s work concerning a co-operative society gave emphasis to the role of trade unionism. Ross responded to left-wing appeals of this kind enthusiastically. He became a founding member of the Queensland Socialist League in 1894 and helped to found the Socialist Democratic Vanguard in 1900. He married Ethel Slaughter, who would become an ally in his political efforts, on 14 March 1900.

Ross left Brisbane in January 1903 in order to edit Broken Hill's Barrier Truth, but soon found himself at odds with the local workers' movement over strategy and his anti-clerical concerns. Reproached for undermining the authority of the local Australian Labor Party chapter, Ross resolved to abandon Barrier Truth following a vote of no confidence in his editorship and resigned his position in November 1905. Consolidating support as head of the Barrier Social Democratic Club, he went on to establish and edit the Flame. Employed as a Broken Hill librarian from 1906 to 1908, he succeeded in introducing radical literature into the municipal library.

Ross became secretary and editor of the Victorian Socialist Party's magazine the Socialist in August 1908. Lavishly praised by Tom Mann, he received accolades a "comrade" of "whom it would be impossible to speak too highly, he is exceptionally well read, keeps in touch with the movement internationally... a good platform man, but superb as an editor." At times and attracted to and at times repelled by the Australian Labor Party throughout his life, he supported permeation tactics following the failure of Socialists against the Labor Party candidates.

Ross edited New Zealand's Maoriland Worker in Wellington from 1911 before returning to edit the socialist press in Melbourne, Victoria in April 1913. A strong supporter of secular society and rationalist ideas, Ross joined the Victorian Rationalist Association during the Melbourne period. His influential pamphlet Eureka—Freedom Fight of '54 appeared in 1914 – in commemoration of the Eureka miners' rebellion of sixty years earlier.

A significant portion of Ross' political work during the First World War, which Ross stood against from the beginning as a committed pacifist, consisted of anti-war activities. He agitated for a general strike against Australia's entry into the conflict in 1914, and lent his support to various organizations organized to oppose the draft and the wartime crackdown on the political opposition at home. He was arrested for such activities on various occasions after 1914, but remained unflinchingly committed to the anti-war cause in spite the political repression targeting the pacifists and socialists during this time. The Magazine of Protest, Personality and Progress, founded and edited by Ross during the war and soon known simply as Ross' Magazine, came to acquire a reputation as a source of anti-militarist, anti-clerical, socialist, and atheist radicalism.

Though he considered Bolshevik methods of struggle inapplicable to Australia – and would continue to support the distinctly moderate line of reformism for the remainder of his career – Ross greeted the 1917 Revolution in Russia warmly and produced the supportive pamphlet Revolution in Russia and Australia in 1920. A satirical article entitled "Bolshevism Has Broken Out in Heaven" – penned by an anonymous author known only as "Woodicus" and published in a Ross-edited magazine – led to a Melbourne blasphemy trial and a sentence of six months' imprisonment. Undaunted, Ross protested the looming gaoling by joining the poet R. H. Long and other socialists in Brisbane for an illegal public display of a red flag – one more activity officially forbidden at the time. The flag-wavers were violently suppressed and Ross was once more arrested. The draconian sentence for blasphemy was, however, eventually reduced to a mere fine of £50 on appeal.

No longer so much on the political fringe during the 1920s, Ross cemented his association with the Australian Labor Party in the post-war decade. He became council-member of the University of Melbourne in 1925, and trustee of the Melbourne's public library and museums as well as the National Gallery in 1928; he was appointed a commissioner of the State Savings Bank in November 1930. The Victoria branch of the Labor Party elected him to its vice-presidential post in 1930–1931.

Ross died of uraemia in Richmond, Victoria on 24 September 1931 and was cremated after a modest and secular ceremony. Among those paying the last respects were Tom Tunnecliffe, J. P. Jones, Don Cameron, and Harry Scott Bennett.

Ross' two sons, Lloyd (1901–87) and Edgar (1904–2001), both became prominent as Australian activists and trade unionists.
