= John Bonney (actor) =

Australian actor

- Born: 15 November 1933; England
- Died: June 1993 (aged 59)
- Occupation: Actor
- Years active: 1950s-1993
- Notable work: Contrabandits

John Bonney (15 November 1933 - June 1993) was an Australian actor. He played lead roles in Contrabandits and Waterloo Station and was a host of The Marriage Game.

Bonney was born in England and moved to Australia at age 17 where he started acting classes and worked in radio plays. He returned to England and continued studying acting working on TV and at West End. Film roles during this time include Paranoiac, The Yellow Teddy Bears, Saturday Night Out and 633 Squadron. Returning to Australia in 1966 he landed a role in Contrabandits. He quit acting in 1973 before returning in 1981 as a guest star on an episode of MPSIB. 1983 saw him in Waterloo Station and in 1988 appeared as Robert Menzies in True Believers.
