= Spider and Rose =

- Directed by: Bill Bennett
- Written by: Bill Bennett
- Produced by: Lyn McCarthy; Graeme Tubbenhauer
- Starring: Ruth Cracknell; Simon Bossell; Max Cullen
- Cinematography: Andrew Lesnie
- Edited by: Henry Dangar
- Music by: The Cruel Sea
- Production companies: Dendy Films; Australian Film Finance Corp
- Release date: 1994
- Country: Australia
- Language: English
- Budget: $3.38 million
- Box office: A$856,905 (Australia)

Spider and Rose is a 1994 Australian film directed by Bill Bennett and starring Ruth Cracknell, Simon Bossell, and Max Cullen. It is about the relationship between an elderly lady, and a young ambulance driver.

It won the audience award at the Tromsø International Film Festival in 1995.

== Plot ==
An ambulance driver, Spider, 22, has to take a seventy-year-old woman, Rose on a six-hour trip to her family farm. It's his last day at work and he wants to get back for a party he has organised. Spider and Rose clash but over time they form a bond.

== Cast ==
- Ruth Cracknell as Rose Dougherty
- Simon Bossell as Spider McCall
- Max Cullen as Jack
- Marshall Napier as Henderson
- Bruce Venables as truck driver
- Jennifer Cluff as Helen Dougherty
- Lewis Fitz-Gerald as Robert Dougherty
- Tina Bursill as Sister Abbott
- Beth Champion as Nurse Price
- Bob Baines as Ambo Officer Muggleston

== Production ==
Bennett claimed he wanted to make something "a bit more mainstream" than his earlier films. The story was inspired by his grandmother who lost her partner in a road accident. He was also inspired by having been in a several car crash himself in the 1970s which gave him a great appreciation for ambulance drivers.

Bennett later said he did not regard the film as a comedy but "a drama that would have some funny bits in it... Even now I don't see the film as a comedy. I regard it as quite a serious treatise on the way we treat the aged."

Bennett estimated it took four years from writing the first treatment through to the completion of the film.

The movie was entirely funded by the AFFC. However it did not want to cast Ruth Cracknell or Simon Bossell. "Ruth Cracknell has yet to deliver a credible screen performance and Simon Bossell (Joh’s Jury) is highly inexperienced", wrote FFC executive Catriona Hughes to the FFC board. According to Bennett, FFC head John Morris would only finance the movie if Cracknell was not cast, but Bennett insisted; Morris relented but warned it would be a mistake.

Shooting took place near Mudgee.

== Reception ==
David Stratton of Variety wrote "On paper, the idea of an odd-couple generation-gap road movie hardly seems promising, so it's a minor miracle that writer/director Bill Bennett has managed to inject life into such familiar material."

The film led to Bennett being hired to make Two If by Sea.
