= Russell Kiefel =

Australian actor (1951–2016)

- Born: Russell John Kiefel; 1951; Tully, Queensland, Australia
- Died: 20 November 2016 (aged 65); Darwin, Northern Territory, Australia
- Occupation: Actor
- Years active: 1977–2016
- Spouse: Katrina Foster
- Children: 2
- Relatives: Susan Kiefel (sister)

Russell John Kiefel (1951 – 20 November 2016) was an Australian stage, film and television actor. After graduating from the National Institute of Dramatic Art, Kiefel started his screen acting career with a role in the 1977 feature film The Singer and the Dancer. He followed this with roles in Breaker Morant (1980), Twelfth Night (1986), Call Me Mr. Brown (1990) and television film The Leaving of Liverpool (1992). Kiefel appeared in several television dramas, including Home and Away, Fireflies and Stingers. He starred in an episode of Twisted Tales in 1998. Among his various guest appearances were episodes of Wildside, Blue Heelers and Something in the Air. In 2008, Kiefel played Lloyd Ross in Infamous Victory: Ben Chifley's Battle for Coal. He joined the cast of Neighbours in the recurring role of Russell Brennan in 2015.

Kiefel worked with various theatre companies throughout his stage career, appearing in numerous productions. His earliest roles were with the Old Tote Theatre Company. He appeared in both the Australian and American seasons of A Streetcar Named Desire and Travelling North. Kiefel was closely associated with Belvoir and appeared in several productions for them, including Run Rabbit Run and The Blind Giant is Dancing. He starred in the 2009 production of The Alchemist at the Sydney Opera House. Kiefel fell ill while appearing in And I'm the Queen of Sheba at the Browns Mart Theatre in Darwin, and he died on 20 November 2016.

== Early life ==
Kiefel was born in Tully, Queensland in 1951, to Alf, an accountant, and Patsy, a homemaker. He has two younger sisters, including former Chief Justice of Australia Susan Kiefel. After moving to Brisbane, Kiefel attended Sandgate High School. During his teenage years, he acted with Twelfth Night Theatre and La Boite Theatre Company. Kiefel moved to Sydney so he could attend the National Institute of Dramatic Art, and he graduated in 1974.

== Career ==
=== Theatre ===
Kiefel was a prolific stage actor and worked with various theatre companies throughout his career, including Sydney Theatre Company (STC), Bell Shakespeare, and Queensland Theatre Company. His earliest roles were with the Old Tote Theatre Company in productions at the Sydney Opera House from 1977. Throughout the 1980s, Kiefel worked with the State Theatre Company of South Australia. He made 13 appearances for the STC. He appeared in Our Town, and the Australian and American seasons of A Streetcar Named Desire and Travelling North. In November 1987, Kiefel played Valantin, alongside Barry Otto, in Egil Kipste's production of Kiss of the Spider Woman for the Nimrod Theatre Company. Kiefel began working with the Queensland Theatre Company in 1988 in productions of Night and Day and The Recruiting Officer. He was also associated with the Belvoir company and appeared in several productions for them, including Ray's Tempest, Stuff Happens, Hamlet, The Power of Yes, The Business and Run Rabbit Run.

While appearing as Surly in the company's 1996 production of The Alchemist, Kiefel had to leave during one show after learning that his wife had gone into labour. His co-star Sam Wilcox took over his role for the second act. Later stage roles saw Kiefel appear in Tom Holloway's And No More Shall We Part for the Griffin Theatre Company. He starred in the 2009 production of The Alchemist at the Playhouse, Sydney Opera House. This time he played the role of Master Lovewit. In 2016, Kiefel performed in The Blind Giant is Dancing for Belvoir. He had starred in the show three times previously, including the original production in 1983. New play And I'm the Queen of Sheba was Kiefel's final stage performance. It opened at the Browns Mart Theatre on 17 November. Kiefel played the role of Frank and had been involved in the production since April 2016.

=== Television and film ===
Kiefel began his screen acting career with a role in Gillian Armstrong's 1977 feature film The Singer and the Dancer. He went on to appear in the 1980 film Breaker Morant, Neil Armfield's 1986 film version of Twelfth Night, Call Me Mr. Brown, which was made in 1985 but not released until 1990, telemovie The Leaving of Liverpool, and comedy drama feature Children of the Revolution. Other film roles included No Escape (1994), Radiance (1998), Dogwatch (1999) and Fresh Air (1999).

Kiefel made numerous recurring and guest appearances in television series, including Wildside, Water Rats, Blue Heelers, Stingers and Something in the Air. He played Roy O'Neale in Home and Away from 1993 to 1994. Following this, he guested in children's science-fiction drama Escape from Jupiter, and joined the cast of Heartbreak High. In 1998, he starred in an episode of the anthology and mystery drama series Twisted Tales, alongside Robert Taylor. Kiefel was part of the ensemble cast of television film The Junction Boys, which centres on the life of American college football coach Bear Bryant. After appearing in the ABC television film Fireflies in 2003, Kiefel was subsequently cast in the lead role of Sharpie in the television series of the same name. In 2008, Kiefel appeared as political adviser Lloyd Ross in the television documentary Infamous Victory: Ben Chifley's Battle for Coal. He was also part of the ensemble cast of the 2014 telemovie Schapelle.

Artist Demian Carey Gibbins painted Kiefel in 2015, and reached the semi-finals of the Doug Moran National Portrait Prize with the piece he titled A Familiar Face. From 29 July 2015, Kiefel played the role of Russell Brennan in the television soap opera Neighbours. His character was introduced as the father of the established Brennan brothers, and his arrival started a domestic violence storyline for the family. Kiefel had previously worked as a scriptwriter for the serial in the 1990s. Producers had plans to bring the character back following his initial arc, but they had to change the storyline due to Kiefel's death. They introduced his character's former wife Fay Brennan (played by Zoe Bertram) instead. Kiefel's later television appearances were recurring and guest roles in Tricky Business, Childhood's End and Secret City.

== Personal life ==
Kiefel was married to actress Katrina Foster. The couple had two sons.

Kiefel died on 20 November 2016. He had fallen ill on 18 November, while appearing in a production of And I'm the Queen of Sheba at the Browns Mart Theatre in Darwin. The theatre cancelled the rest of the season out of respect, and later held a memorial for Kiefel on 18 December. Kiefel's former co-stars and friends paid tribute to him on social media. He is survived by his sisters, his wife and sons.

== Filmography ==
=== Film ===
Year	Title	Role	Notes
1977	The Singer and the Dancer	Pete	
1980	Breaker Morant	Christiaan Botha	
1986	Twelfth Night	Sea Captain	
1990	Call Me Mr. Brown	Ray Poynting	
1991	The Girl Who Came Late	Nell's Father	
1994	No Escape	Iceman	
1996	Children of the Revolution	Barry Rogers	
1998	Radiance	Father Doyle	
1999	Fresh Air	Preacher	
1999	Dogwatch	Palmer	
2002	Queen of the Damned	Fire Marshall	
2014	Son of a Gun	Mick	

=== Television ===
Year	Title	Role	Notes
1978	Chopper Squad	Cliff Hanger	
1992	The Leaving of Liverpool	Brogan	Television film
1993	Police Rescue	Pellegrini	Episode: "Lift Sixteen"
1993–1994	Home and Away	Roy O'Neale	Recurring role
1994	Escape from Jupiter	Gilbert	Episode: "Rescue"
1994–1995	Heartbreak High	Norm Rivers	
1997	Big Sky	Detective #1	Episode: "The Principal"
1997	Blue Heelers	Mal Truesdale	2 episodes
1997	The Hostages	Jim	Television film
1998	Twisted Tales	George	Episode: "A Sure Thing"
1998	Wildside	Don Kapper	3 episodes
1998	A Difficult Woman	Prime Minister	
1999	Big Sky	Roberts	Episode: "Secrets and Lies"
2000	Water Rats	Lewis West	2 episodes
2000	Blue Heelers	Keith Cashell	Episode: "Unfinished Business"
2000	SeaChange	Ian Cameron	Episode: "Love in the Time of Coleridge"
2000–2004	Stingers	Andrew Bligh	
2001–2002	Something in the Air	Tas	4 episodes
2002	The Junction Boys	Doake Gearhart	Television film
2004	Fireflies	Sharpie	
2006	All Saints	Ian Cosgrove	Episode: "Shadows of the Heart"
2006	headLand	Lionel Travers	2 episodes
2006	McLeod's Daughters	Eric Weatherdon	Episode: "The Legend of Harry Ryan"
2007	Murder in the Outback	Kesby	Television film
2008	All Saints	Lenny	Episode: "Comfort Zone"
2008	Infamous Victory: Ben Chifley's Battle for Coal	Lloyd Ross	Television documentary
2009	Chandon Pictures	Warwick	4 episodes
2009	A Model Daughter: The Killing of Caroline Byrne	John Abernethy	Television film
2010	Underbelly: The Golden Mile	Mel Mal	Episode: "The Crucible"
2010	Rake	Warwick Torrens	Episode: "R vs Langhorn"
2011	Spirited	Engineer	Episode: "I'll Close My Eyes"
2012	Tricky Business	Hugh Goodman	5 episodes
2014	Schapelle	Malcolm McCauley	
2015	Neighbours	Russell Brennan	Recurring role
2015	Childhood's End	Sheriff De Bont	2 episodes
2016	Secret City	Olmstead	3 episodes

== Theatre ==
Year	Title	Role	Type
	Travelling North		STC
1971	The Rose and the Ring		Twelfth Night Theatre
1971	The Measures Taken / The Real Inspector Hound		Twelfth Night Theatre
1972	Sadie and Neco / In His Own Write / Allergy / Stay Where You Are		Jane Street Theatre
1972	Spitting Image		Jane Street Theatre
1973	Romeo and Juliet		NIDA Theatre
1973	Saved		National Institute of Dramatic Art (NIDA)
1973	He Who Gets Slapped		NIDA Theatre
1974	The Miser		NIDA Theatre
1974	The Poets of Pleasure		NIDA Theatre
1974	The Merchant of Venice		NIDA Theatre
1974	Fings Ain't Wot They Used T'be		NIDA Theatre
1977	Twelfth Night		Nimrod Upstairs
1977	The Tempest		Sydney Opera House
1978	Black Comedy		Sydney Opera House
1978	The Misanthrope		Sydney Opera House
1981	No Names ... No Pack Drill		Playhouse, Newcastle
1981	Lulu		Playhouse Adelaide, Sydney Opera House
1982	A Midsummer Night's Dream		Playhouse Adelaide
1982	Spellbound		Playhouse Adelaide
1982	Mother Courage and Her Children		Playhouse Adelaide
1982	Silver Lining		Playhouse Adelaide
1982	The Prince of Homburg		Playhouse Adelaide
1982	Lighthouse Playreading		Playhouse Adelaide
1982	Royal Show		Playhouse Adelaide
1983	Twelfth Night		Playhouse Adelaide
1983	Blood Wedding		Playhouse Adelaide
1983	A Midsummer Night's Dream		Keith Michell Theatre, SA
1983-84	Netherwood		Playhouse Adelaide, Seymour Centre
1983	The Marriage of Figaro		Playhouse Adelaide
1983	Pal Joey		Playhouse Adelaide
1983	The Blind Giant is Dancing		Playhouse Adelaide
1983	Sunrise		Playhouse Adelaide
1984	Beach Blanket Tempest		North Queensland tour, Araluen Arts Centre, Playhouse Adelaide, Canberra Theatre Centre
1984	Key Largo		North Queensland tour
1984	Don's Party		North Queensland tour
1984	The Season at Sarsaparilla		Playhouse Adelaide
1985	The Doll Trilogy: Kid Stakes / Other Times / Summer of the Seventeenth Doll		Sydney Opera House, Melbourne Athenaeum
1986	Dreams in an Empty City		Playhouse Adelaide
1986	Are You Lonesome Tonight?		Her Majesty's Theatre, Sydney, Festival Theatre Adelaide
1987	The Winter's Tale		Playhouse Adelaide
1987	Kiss of the Spider Woman	Valantin	Seymour Centre with Nimrod Theatre Company
1988	Hedda Gabler		Princess Theatre, Woolloongabba
1988	The Lady Aoi		Princess Theatre, Woolloongabba
1988	Night and Day		Suncorp Theatre, Brisbane with QTC
1988	The Recruiting Officer		Albert Park Amphitheatre, Brisbane with QTC
1989	Major Barbara		Playhouse Adelaide, Suncorp Theatre Brisbane
1989	Miranda		La Boite Theatre
1989	Popular Front		Princess Theatre, Woolloongabba
1989	Ghosts		Cremorne Theatre
1989	The Taming of the Shrew		Suncorp Theatre, Brisbane
1990	The Tempest		Belvoir Street Theatre
1991	The Revenger's Tragedy		Sydney Opera House
1991	Racing Demon		Wharf Theatre
1991	King Golgrutha		Playhouse Adelaide
1992	Shadow and Splendour		Suncorp Theatre, Brisbane
1992	A Cheery Soul		Suncorp Theatre, Brisbane
1992	Twelfth Night		Suncorp Theatre, Brisbane
1992	Hotel Sorrento		Cremorne Theatre
1994	King Lear		Sydney Opera House
1994	Passion		Stables Theatre
1994	The Night of the Missing Bridegroom		Stables Theatre
1994	Love Seen in Laundromat		Stables Theatre
1994	Barefoot		Stables Theatre
1995	Hamlet		Space Theatre Adelaide, Playhouse Melbourne
1995	Sydney Stories 1: The Ninth Wonder / The Price of Prayer / The Last Days of a Famous Mime / Family Running for Mr. Whippy		Wharf Theatre with Sydney Theatre Company
1995	Saint Joan		Sydney Opera House
1995	The Blind Giant is Dancing		Belvoir Street Theatre
1995	The Tempest		Space Theatre, Adelaide
1996	Simpatico		Suncorp Theatre, Brisbane
1996	Adult Recreation		Metro Arts, Brisbane
1996	The Alchemist	Surly	Belvoir Street Theatre
1997	Don's Party		Playhouse Adelaide
1998	King Lear		Playhouse Canberra, Melbourne Athenaeum, Playhouse Brisbane, Sydney Opera House
1999	Macbeth		Sydney Opera House
2001	The Prodigal Son / Insouciance		Malthouse Theatre
2001	Nowhere		Malthouse Theatre
2002	Macbeth		Wharf Theatre
2003	Rabbit		Stables Theatre
2004	Run Rabbit Run		Belvoir Theatre Company
2004	Our Lady of Sligo		Belvoir Street Theatre
2004	The Spook		Belvoir Street Theatre, Glen Street Theatre, Playhouse Brisbane
2005	Ray's Tempest		Belvoir Theatre Company
2005	Stuff Happens		Seymour Centre, Comedy Theatre, Melbourne with Belvoir Theatre Company
2006	Under Ice		Wharf Theatre
2006	American Buffalo		Bille Brown Studio, Brisbane
2007	The Gates of Egypt		Belvoir Street Theatre
2007	Self-Esteem		Wharf Theatre
2007	King Tide		Stables Theatre
2008	Hamlet		Sydney Opera House, Playhouse Melbourne
2009	The Alchemist	Master Lovewit	Sydney Opera House, Playhouse Brisbane, Canberra Theatre Centre, His Majesty's Theatre Perth
2009	A Streetcar Named Desire		John F. Kennedy Center for the Performing Arts, Brooklyn Academy of Music with STC
2010	The Power of Yes		Belvoir Theatre Company
2010	Our Town		Sydney Opera House with STC
2011	The Business		Belvoir Theatre Company
2011	And No More Shall We Part		Stables Theatre with Griffin Theatre Company
2012	Buried City		Belvoir Street Theatre
2013	The Table of Knowledge		Hopgood Theatre Adelaide, Lennox Theatre Parramatta, Butter Factory Theatre Wodonga, Belvoir Street Theatre
2016	The Blind Giant is Dancing		Belvoir Theatre Company
2017	And I'm the Queen of Sheba	Frank	Browns Mart Theatre, Darwin
