= Wagga Wagga Civic Theatre =

Coordinates: 35°6′33″S 147°22′20″E

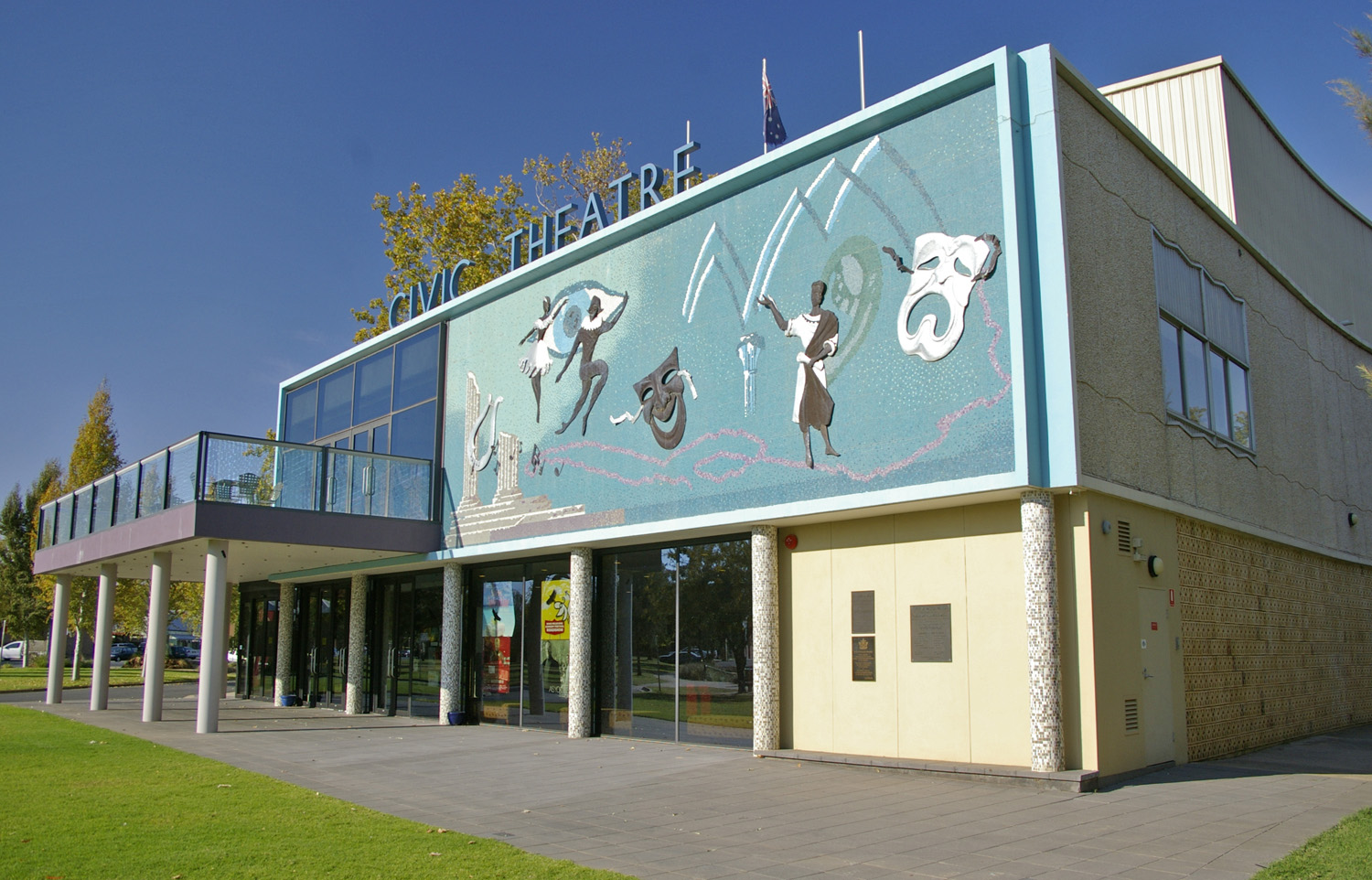
- Interactive map of Wagga Wagga Civic Theatre
- Address: Wagga Wagga, New South Wales
- Owner: Wagga Wagga City Council
- Capacity: 492

Construction
- Opened: 1963

Website
- www.civictheatre.com.au

Wagga Wagga Civic Theatre is located in Wagga Wagga, New South Wales, Australia at the Wagga Wagga Civic Centre. It is adjacent to Wollundry Lagoon, art gallery and Wollundry Amphitheatre. The Civic Theatre opened in 1963. It was renovated in 1999/2000, opening again in May 2000. It underwent renovations again at the end of 2017 and the beginning of 2018. New chairs were installed, taking the seating capacity up by four - from 488 to 492. Wider seats were also added as well as a wheelchair lift for backstage.

The main auditorium has a seating capacity of 492 and features an orchestra pit seating up to 38 musicians. The upstairs foyer, which is used for small functions, features a licensed bar and has a seating capacity of 132. The smaller basement theatre located at the rear of the building is the home of the School of Arts Community Theatre (SOACT).

== History ==
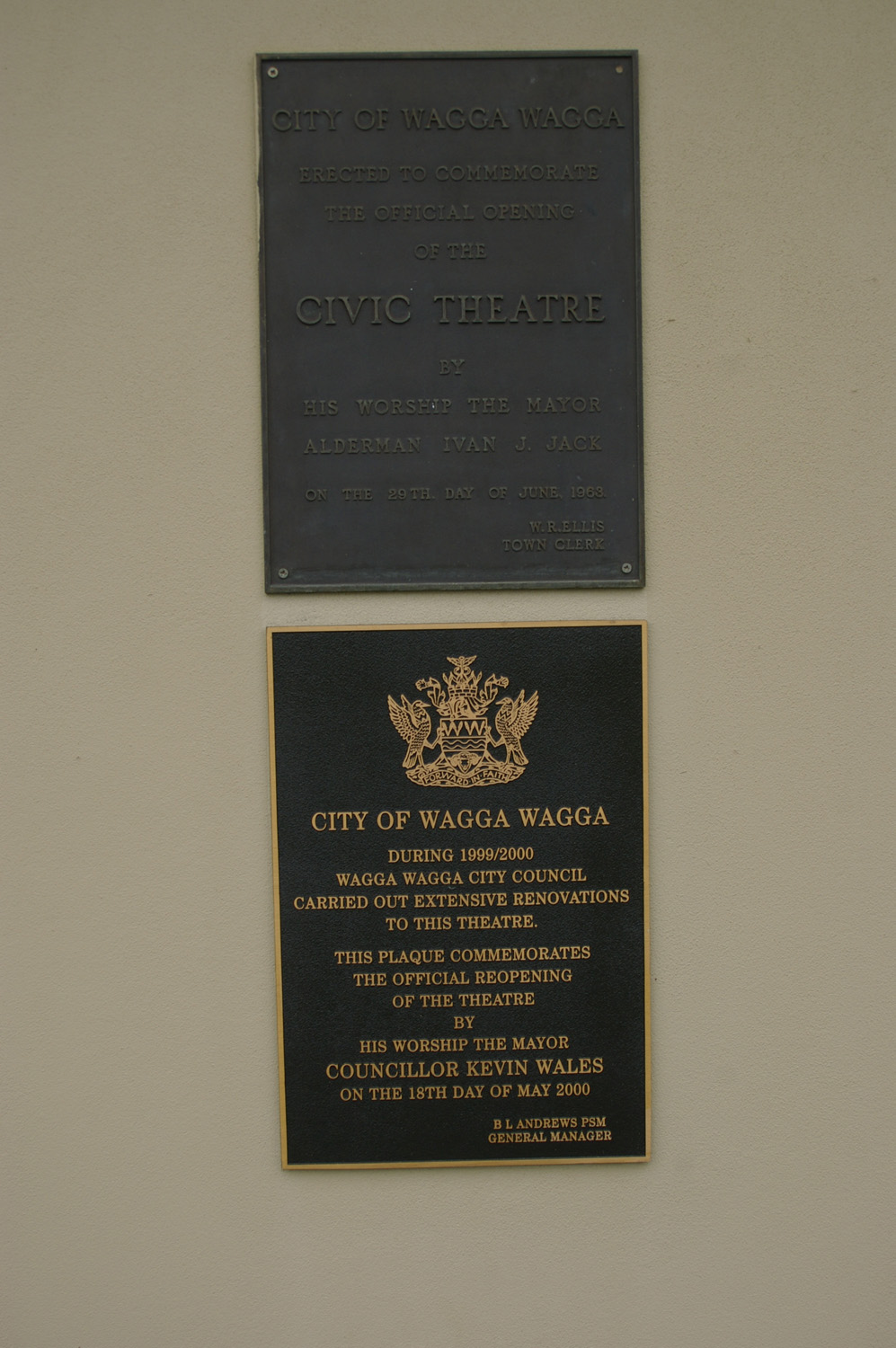
Wagga Civic Theatre plaques

The theatre was built after community demand for a large public venue and included in the budget of £165,000 were donations from the community.

The construction caused controversy within the community due to the destruction of parts of the rose gardens to make room for the theatre, concerns about the adequacy of the seating capacity of 497 and criticism of the mural which adorns the front of the building.

The finished theatre was opened on Saturday 29 June 1963 by Ald. Ivan J. Jack during an official ceremony which featured a preview of Oklahoma! the first large production to be staged at the theatre.

Minor upgrades continued until the late 1990s when the theatre received a multimillion-dollar upgrade as part of a Civic Centre upgrade. Upgrades in the project included new upstairs and downstairs foyers, complete refurbishment of the auditorium, new scenery loading dock, new sound system and other technical upgrades. However the backstage area remained largely untouched.

Following its re-opening in 2001, the theatre now presents an annual theatre season and hosts national and international touring productions with local professional and community users.
