= Victorian Socialist Party =

Former political party in Victoria, Australia

- Founded: 1906; 119 years ago
- Dissolved: 1932; 93 years ago
- Newspaper: The Socialist
- Membership (1907): 2,000
- Ideology: Socialism
- Political position: Left-wing

The Victorian Socialist Party (VSP), also known as the Socialist Party of Victoria, was a socialist political party in the Australian state of Victoria during the early 20th century.

Most VSP members were also members of the Australian Labor Party (ALP), or later became members. A faction of the VSP hoped to "bore from within" and win the ALP for socialism. Members who were later prominent included John Curtin (Prime Minister of Australia 1941–45), Frank Anstey (a federal Labor MP 1910–34), Maurice Blackburn (a federal MP 1934–43), Don Cameron (a Senator 1938–1962), Fred Katz (a Senator 1947–1951), and John Cain (three times Premier of Victoria). Cameron was an organiser from 1919 and edited The Socialist from 1920 to 1923.

== Beliefs ==
Despite the party labelling itself Marxist, "the Party's socialism in reality involved a loosely integrated body of ideas, largely British in origin or form".

The Victorian Socialist Party in 1905 was "unique among Australian political organisations for its explicit opposition to racism". This was in conflict with the mainstream Labor movement which was in favor of the White Australia policy. Party members such as Tom Mann and John Curtin took the stance of anti-imperialism and internationalism, while members such as Maurice Blackburn argued that Australia required a strong army to enforce the White Australia policy. However, after Tom Mann's departure in 1909, the party began to less strongly oppose racism. By 1921, after the foundation of the Communist Party of Australia, the then secretary Robert Ross advocated a eugenicist stance, stating to 'keep your races pure'.

The VSP did not primarily contest parliamentary elections, seeing itself mainly as a force for socialist education in the wider Labor movement. The Victorian Socialist Party established a variety of cultural activities and institutions to form a community of socialists. These included more mainstream activities such as "regular lectures on political topics, speakers classes, the writing and distribution of radical literature, and public protest" to more eccentric such as "dances, camps, bicycle riding clubs, choirs, a Sunday School for youth". Despite the Victorian Socialist Party's rejection of independently running in elections, the party did contest the 1908 Victorian state election.

== History ==
The party was founded in 1906 in Melbourne as a merger of a number of older socialist groupings. A leading influence in the VSP's formation was the British trade unionist Tom Mann, who lived in Australia from 1903 to 1910. Its leading figure was Robert Samuel Ross, a talented organiser and journalist. In 1907 it had about 2,000 members.

In 1907, the VSP, plus similar groups in the other Australian states, came together in a loose federal organisation calling itself the Socialist Federation of Australia, but this never became a functioning national party. Like other socialist parties, the VSP supported the "One Big Union" campaign advocating a united national labour movement, a campaign which led to the establishment of the Australian Council of Trade Unions.

The Russian Revolution of 1917 caused a crisis for the VSP. Like most socialists, the party initially welcomed the revolution, but by 1920 democratic socialists such as Ross had become critical of the Bolshevik regime. In 1921 a VSP member who had moved to Sydney, Bill Earsman, was one of the founders of the Communist Party of Australia. Many VSP members joined the new party, but the majority, led by Ross, remained aloof. "The labour movement's championing of democratic rights and improved standards of life has so altered the Australian environment as to make Bolshevism inapplicable," he wrote. Ross's two sons, Lloyd Ross and Edgar Ross, however, both became prominent Communist Party members.

The VSP faded away in the following years, finding that there was little political space between the Australian Labor Party and the Communist Party of Australia. Cameron remained its secretary until 1932, by which time the party was moribund.

== See also ==
- Socialism in Australia
- The Socialist (1906–1923), newspaper of the party
