= Jeremiah Wall =

Australian politician (1855–1938)

Jeremiah Wall (1 May 1855 – 24 June 1938) was an Australian politician. He was an Australian Labor Party member of the Victorian Legislative Assembly from 1908 to 1911, representing the electorate of Port Fairy.

Wall was born at Illowa and was raised at Port Fairy, then was a farmer and grazier at Broadwater and then Kirkstall. He was a Shire of Belfast councillor from 1891 to 1899, secretary of the Kirkstall Sports Club, a committee member of the Kirkstall Rowing Club and secretary of the Kirkstall and then Bessiebelle branches of the Labor Party. He was a well-known footballer in the district in his youth, playing for both Port Fairy and Tower Hill teams.

Wall was the unsuccessful Labor candidate for Port Fairy at the 1907 state election. The Labor Call suggested many years later that his 1907 defeat may have been caused by his strident support for the legal enactment of an eight-hour day for agricultural workers. Duffus was elected to the Legislative Assembly the following year at the 1908 election, defeating incumbent James Francis Duffus on the second attempt. However, he was again defeated by Duffus in 1911 in their third contest.

After his parliamentary career, Wall settled permanently at Bessiebelle, where had selected 320 acres in 1879. In earlier years Wall been involved in schemes for draining the Eumerella Swamp to assist in farming the Bessiebelle area. During the 1910s, he was heavily involved in the Port Fairy-Macarthur Railway League, which pursued a railway connection to Macarthur. Wall referred to the challenging nature of farming at Bessiebelle in his railway lobbying.

He never married and lived with his sister at Bessiebelle for many years. He died in Port Fairy Hospital in June 1938 aged 83 and was buried in the Roman Catholic section of Port Fairy Cemetery.

Parliament of Victoria
Preceded by James Duffus	Member for Port Fairy; 1908–1911	Succeeded by James Duffus
