= Simon Bossell =

Australian actor

- Occupation: Actor
- Notable work: Spider and Rose, Hotel de Love

Simon Bossell is an Australian actor. He played lead roles of Spider in Spider and Rose, and Stephen in Hotel de Love. Other featured screen role include Muggers, Better Than Sex Cut, Joh's Jury and Love Bytes,

Stage roles Bossell featured in include Amy's View (The Playhouse, 1998), No Man's Island (Old Fitzroy Hotel, 2009), and touring as Lysander in A Midsummer Night's Dream (multiple venues, 2004)

Bossell began his career on Home and Away before studying at the National Institute of Dramatic Art.
