= Electoral district of Port Fairy =

Former electoral district of Victoria, Australia

Coordinates: 38°22′S 142°14′E

Port Fairy Victoria—Legislative Assembly
- Port Fairy is in current Moyne Shire
- State: Victoria
- Created: 1889
- Abolished: 1927
- Demographic: Rural

Port Fairy was an electoral district of the Legislative Assembly in the Australian state of Victoria from 1889 to 1927. It was created when the Electoral district of Belfast was renamed. Bryan O'Loghlen was the last member for Belfast, serving 1888–1889.

It centred on the coastal town of Port Fairy in western Victoria. It was replaced in 1927 by the Electoral district of Port Fairy and Glenelg.

In 2002, Port Fairy was incorporated into the South-West Coast electorate. Denis Napthine has been the sitting member since 2002.

== Members for Port Fairy ==
Member	Party	Term
Bryan O'Loghlen	Unaligned	1889–1894
James Duffus	Unaligned	1894–1897
Bryan O'Loghlen	Unaligned	1897–1900
James Duffus	Unaligned	1900–1908
Jeremiah Wall	Labor	1908–1911
James Duffus	Liberal	1911–1914
Henry Bailey	Labor	1914–1927
