= 1908 Victorian state election =

Australian state election

- 29 December 1908

All 65 seats in the Victorian Legislative Assembly 33 seats needed for a majority
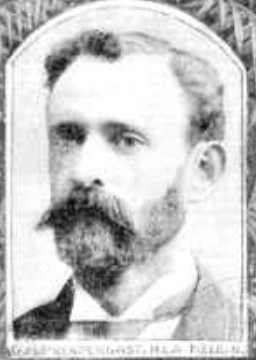

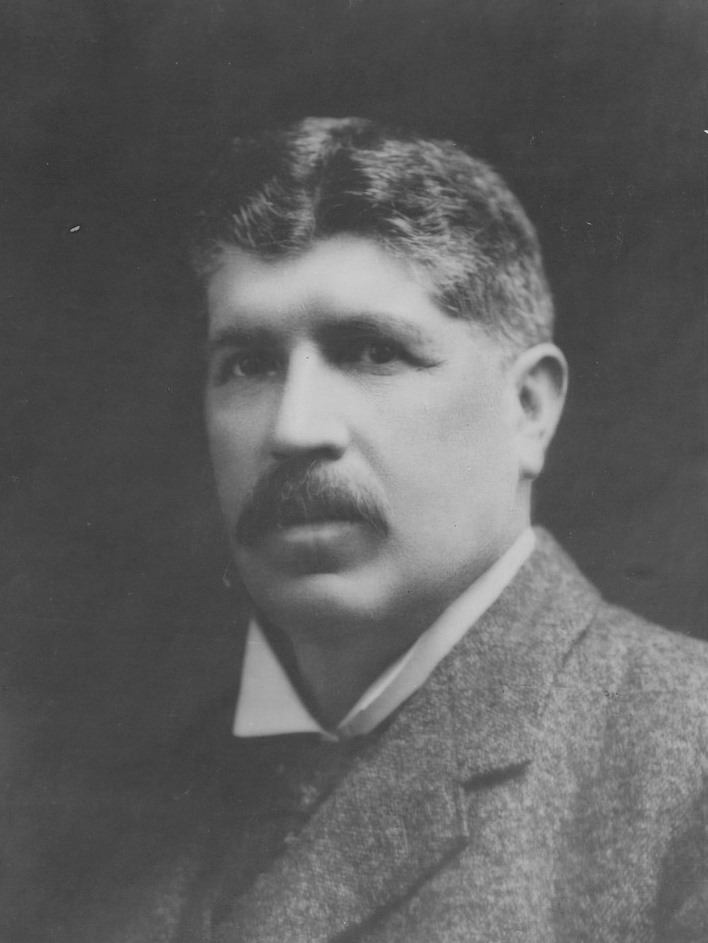

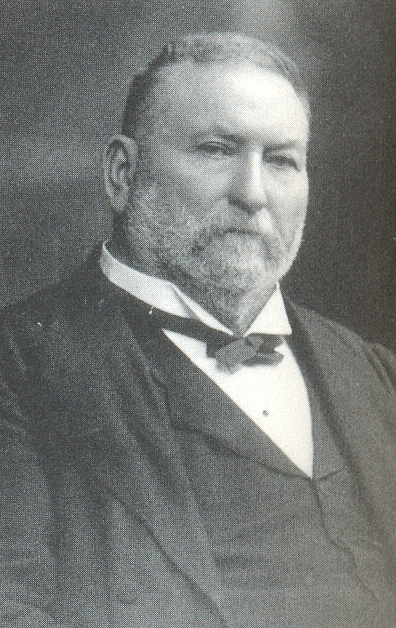
	First party	Second party	Third party
Leader	George Prendergast	John Murray	Thomas Bent
Party	Labor	Liberal	United Liberal
Leader since	1904	1908	1907
Leader's seat	North Melbourne	Warrnambool	Brighton
Last election	14 seats	Did not exist	49 seats
Seats won	21 seats	18 seats	24 seats
Seat change	▲7	▲18	▼25
Percentage	34.78	33.94	19.98
Swing	▲1.85%	▲33.94%	▼31.38%
Premier before election
Thomas Bent
United Liberal
Elected Premier
John Murray
Liberal

The 1908 Victorian state election was held in the Australian state of Victoria on 29 December 1908 to elect 40 of the 65 members of the state's Legislative Assembly. The other 25 seats were uncontested.

The election was in single-member districts, using first-past-the-post voting.

== Background ==
The National Citizens' Reform League, led by Thomas Bent, had disbanded shortly after the 1904 state election, leading to the majority of Liberals and Conservatives sitting separately again for around three years.

Bent formed the United Liberal Party in February 1907, two years before the federal Commonwealth Liberal Party was founded.

However, after only a single year, Liberals John Murray and Alexander Peacock successfully moved a no confidence motion against him. This led to the ULP splitting and the Liberal Party forming.

The Labor side of politics was controlled by the Political Labor Council. In 1904, George Prendergast became the first leader of the Parliamentary Labor Party.

== Results ==
Despite winning the highest number of seats, the United Liberal Party was defeated. John Murray would be chosen as Premier on 6 January 1909 following a conference of both Murray's and Bent's supporters.

25 seats were uncontested.

Legislative Assembly (FPTP)
Party	Votes	%	Swing	Seats	Change
Labor	30,605	34.78	+0.38	21	▲7
Liberal	29,866	33.94	+33.94	18	▲18
United Liberal	17,578	19.98	−31.38	24	▼25
Independent Liberal	5,455	6.20	+6.20	2	▲2
Independent Ministerialist	539	0.61	−8.86	0	▼1
Victorian Socialist	167	0.19	+0.19	0	Steady
Independent	3,785	4.30	+1.94	0	▼1
Formal votes	87,995	99.47			
Informal votes		0.53			
Total	87,995			65	
Registered voters / turnout	263,876	53.64			

== Aftermath ==
On 8 January 1909, John Murray successfully moved a motion of no-confidence in Bent's government and succeeded him as Premier.

Four months later, the federal Commonwealth Liberal Party was formed, into which the Liberals merged.

== See also ==
- Members of the Victorian Legislative Assembly, 1908–1911
