= Edgar Ross (communist) =

Australian journalist, trade unionist and communist organiser

- Ross in his later life
- Born: Edgar Argent Ross; 20 November 1904; Brisbane, Queensland, Australia
- Died: 16 November 2001 (aged 96)
- Relatives: Robert Samuel Ross (father)

Edgar Argent Ross (20 November 1904 – 16 November 2001) was an Australian journalist, trade unionist and communist organiser.

Ross was born in Brisbane to Bob and Ethel Ross, who were based in Broken Hill. Bob Ross, a newspaper editor, was also a foundation member of the Socialist League and the Social Democratic Vanguard, which influenced young Edgar's political development. The family later moved to Melbourne and, briefly, New Zealand, but Edgar attended University High School in Melbourne before becoming a cadet journalist in 1922, joining the Australian Journalists' Association. He was a sporting editor for the Geelong-based Industrial Advocate and wrote book reviews for the Socialist, both of which were edited by his father. By 1925 he was a subeditor with the Barrier Daily Truth, the newspaper of the Workers Industrial Union of Australia. Around this time he joined the Australian Labor Party and developed a close, sometimes prickly rapport with Ernest Wetherell, editor of the Truth. In the late 1920s he supported Wetherell and union leader Dick Quintrell against an attempted coup by racial exclusionist Richard Gully. Ross was soon president of the local Militant Minority Movement, and he joined the Communist Party of Australia (CPA) in 1933, which brought with it active membership in the Movement Against War and Fascism. Around this time he married Patricia Josephine McLauchlan.

In 1935 Ross became editor of the Miners' Federation journal, the Common Cause, in which role he would continue until 1966. He vigorously supported the successful campaign for the forty-hour week and was a mining group representative on the New South Wales Labor Council Executive from 1936 to 1966. From 1939 to 1940 he was the lead writer in the Labor Daily/Daily News, and while the Communist Party was banned in the early 1940s he was a member of the State Labor Party. The SLP amalgamated with the Communist Party in 1944 and Ross was confirmed as a member of the CPA's central committee.

In September 1948 Ross participated in a public debate with Fr P. J. Ryan of the Catholic Social Studies Movement on the nature of communism, attracting an audience of 30,000. He supported the 1949 coalminers' strike, and in 1951 headed the New South Wales Senate ticket for the party. He visited the Soviet Union and China in 1955 and was the Australian delegate to the 22nd Congress of the Communist Party of the Soviet Union in 1961. A Soviet loyalist, he rejected the CPA leadership's reforms in the late 1960s and early 1970s and was expelled from the party, joining the new Socialist Party of Australia. He was the Moscow correspondent for the party's newspaper, the Socialist. Ross also published several works of labour history, including The Russian Revolution: Its Impact on Australia (1967), A History of the Miners' Federation of Australia (1970), Of Storm and Struggle (1982), and These Things Shall Be! Bob Ross, Socialist Pioneer: His Life and Times (1988).
