= Results of the 1996 Victorian state election (Legislative Council) =

Australian state election results

Victorian state election, 30 March 1996 Legislative Council << 1992–1999 >>
Enrolled voters	3,000,076				
Votes cast	2,826,467		Turnout	94.21	–1.01
Informal votes	72,800		Informal	2.58	–1.53
Summary of votes by party
Party	Primary votes	%	Swing	Seats won	Seats held
Liberal	1,208,168	43.87	+0.38	14	28
Labor	1,114,843	40.49	+1.93	5	10
National	182,494	6.63	–2.11	3	6
Democrats	157,798	5.73	+5.42	0	0
Democratic Labor	43,553	1.58	–2.96	0	0
Natural Law	14,129	0.51	–0.11	0	0
Call to Australia	5,576	0.20	+0.12	0	0
Friendly Migrant Workers	1,339	0.05	+0.05	0	0
Independent	25,767	0.94	–2.15	0	0
Total	2,753,667			22	44
Two-party-preferred
Liberal/National	1,482,617	53.96	–2.69		
Labor	1,264,879	46.04	+2.69		

This is a list of Legislative Council results for the Victorian 1996 state election. 22 of the 44 seats were contested.

== Results by province ==
=== Ballarat ===
1996 Victorian state election: Ballarat Province
Party	Candidate	Votes	%	±%
Liberal	Rob Knowles	62,107	51.7	−2.2
Labor	Catherine Laffey	49,943	41.5	+0.7
Democrats	Myrna Rance	4,687	3.9	+3.9
Call to Australia	David Cocking	2,163	1.8	+1.8
Democratic Labor	Brian Lugar	1,343	1.1	−4.2
Total formal votes		120,243	98.2	+1.1
Informal votes		2,258	1.8	−1.1
Turnout		122,501	94.9	
Two-party-preferred result
Liberal	Rob Knowles	65,312	54.4	−0.9
Labor	Catherine Laffey	54,796	45.6	+0.9
Liberal hold		Swing	−0.9	

=== Central Highlands ===
1996 Victorian state election: Central Highlands Province
Party	Candidate	Votes	%	±%
Liberal	Geoff Craige	68,100	54.1	−4.4
Labor	Geoff Cooper	47,608	37.8	+2.3
Democrats	Ray Doensen	7,904	6.3	+6.3
Democratic Labor	Christian Schalken	2,248	1.8	−4.2
Total formal votes		125,860	97.7	+1.0
Informal votes		2,951	2.3	−1.0
Turnout		128,811	95.0	
Two-party-preferred result
Liberal	Geoff Craige	72,329	57.6	−3.3
Labor	Geoff Cooper	53,259	42.4	+3.3
Liberal hold		Swing	−3.3	

=== Chelsea ===
1996 Victorian state election: Chelsea Province
Party	Candidate	Votes	%	±%
Liberal	Cameron Boardman	61,122	50.7	+0.7
Labor	Burwyn Davidson	50,902	42.2	+1.7
Democrats	Kaylyn Raynor	5,694	4.7	+4.7
Democratic Labor	Mechelina Schalken	1,480	1.2	−3.2
Natural Law	Lee Fergusson	1,394	1.2	+1.2
Total formal votes		120,592	97.5	+1.9
Informal votes		3,155	2.5	−1.9
Turnout		123,747	94.3	
Two-party-preferred result
Liberal	Cameron Boardman	64,158	53.3	−0.9
Labor	Burwyn Davidson	56,315	46.7	+0.9
Liberal gain from Labor		Swing	−0.9	

=== Doutta Galla ===
1996 Victorian state election: Doutta Galla Province
Party	Candidate	Votes	%	±%
Labor	Monica Gould	75,717	57.8	+6.4
Liberal	Jody Allatt	47,467	36.2	+0.1
Democrats	John Davey	4,782	3.7	+3.7
Democratic Labor	Gloria Brook	2,997	2.3	−4.4
Total formal votes		130,963	95.6	+2.3
Informal votes		5,984	4.4	−2.3
Turnout		136,947	94.1	
Two-party-preferred result
Labor	Monica Gould	79,968	61.2	+3.2
Liberal	Jody Allatt	50,727	38.8	−3.2
Labor hold		Swing	+3.2	

=== East Yarra ===
1996 Victorian state election: East Yarra Province
Party	Candidate	Votes	%	±%
Liberal	David Davis	72,536	57.3	−6.2
Labor	Morley Muralitharan	38,297	30.2	+0.1
Democrats	Pierre Harcourt	11,372	9.0	+9.0
Natural Law	Lesley Mendelson	2,335	1.8	+1.8
Democratic Labor	John Murphy	2,130	1.7	−4.7
Total formal votes		126,670	98.3	+1.5
Informal votes		2,199	1.7	−1.5
Turnout		128,869	94.0	
Two-party-preferred result
Liberal	David Davis	78,558	62.2	−4.2
Labor	Morley Muralitharan	47,736	37.8	+4.2
Liberal hold		Swing	−4.2	

=== Eumemmerring ===
1996 Victorian state election: Eumemmerring Province
Party	Candidate	Votes	%	±%
Liberal	Neil Lucas	64,976	48.8	−3.8
Labor	Bob Ives	57,243	43.0	+1.8
Democrats	John Hastie	5,478	4.1	+4.1
Call to Australia	Lynne Dickson	3,413	2.6	+2.6
Democratic Labor	Teresa Crea	2,056	1.5	−4.6
Total formal votes		133,166	96.9	+2.0
Informal votes		4,273	3.1	−2.0
Turnout		137,439	94.9	
Two-party-preferred result
Liberal	Neil Lucas	70,196	52.8	−2.3
Labor	Bob Ives	62,780	47.2	+2.3
Liberal gain from Labor		Swing	−2.3	

=== Geelong ===
1996 Victorian state election: Geelong Province
Party	Candidate	Votes	%	±%
Liberal	Ian Cover	63,930	51.2	+6.7
Labor	Carole Marple	54,008	43.3	+3.3
Democrats	Gerald Desmarais	5,599	4.5	+4.5
Democratic Labor	Bill Verhoef	1,332	1.1	−0.4
Total formal votes		124,869	97.8	+1.3
Informal votes		2,852	2.2	−1.3
Turnout		127,721	95.6	
Two-party-preferred result
Liberal	Ian Cover	66,366	53.3	+0.1
Labor	Carole Marple	58,143	46.7	−0.1
Liberal gain from Labor		Swing	+0.1	

=== Gippsland ===
1996 Victorian state election: Gippsland Province
Party	Candidate	Votes	%	±%
National	Peter Hall	67,637	55.7	+55.7
Labor	Christian Zahra	40,837	33.6	+0.8
Democrats	Greg Kerr	5,720	4.7	+4.7
Independent	Ben Buckley	5,375	4.4	−0.2
Democratic Labor	Michael Rowe	1,872	1.5	−2.4
Total formal votes		121,441	97.9	+0.6
Informal votes		2,560	2.1	−0.6
Turnout		124,001	95.0	
Two-party-preferred result
National	Peter Hall	73,844	61.0	−0.9
Labor	Christian Zahra	47,253	39.0	+0.9
National hold		Swing	−0.9	

=== Higinbotham ===
1996 Victorian state election: Higinbotham Province
Party	Candidate	Votes	%	±%
Liberal	John Ross	69,727	56.7	−5.3
Labor	Ken Wilson	42,032	34.2	+3.2
Democrats	Diane Barry	9,655	7.9	+7.9
Democratic Labor	Gail King	1,507	1.2	−1.5
Total formal votes		122,921	98.0	+1.6
Informal votes		2,549	2.0	−1.6
Turnout		125,470	94.2	
Two-party-preferred result
Liberal	John Ross	74,580	60.8	−3.9
Labor	Ken Wilson	48,149	39.2	+3.9
Liberal hold		Swing	−3.9	

=== Jika Jika ===
1996 Victorian state election: Jika Jika Province
Party	Candidate	Votes	%	±%
Labor	Theo Theophanous	70,387	55.3	−0.2
Liberal	George Prillwitz	43,170	33.9	−3.0
Democrats	Yanko Kalincev	9,137	7.2	+7.2
Democratic Labor	Bill Jansen	2,764	2.2	−5.4
Natural Law	Byron Rigby	1,834	1.4	+1.4
Total formal votes		127,292	96.4	+1.9
Informal votes		4,805	3.6	−1.9
Turnout		132,097	94.2	
Two-party-preferred result
Labor	Theo Theophanous	79,806	62.8	+1.5
Liberal	George Prillwitz	47,262	37.2	−1.5
Labor hold		Swing	+1.5	

=== Koonung ===
1996 Victorian state election: Koonung Province
Party	Candidate	Votes	%	±%
Liberal	Gerald Ashman	72,025	56.5	−1.4
Labor	Chrys Abraham	45,323	35.5	−1.3
Democrats	Damian Wise	7,066	5.5	+5.5
Democratic Labor	Paul Cahill	1,810	1.4	−3.9
Independent	Jill Bannan	1,336	1.0	+1.0
Total formal votes		127,560	97.8	+1.6
Informal votes		2,865	2.2	−1.6
Turnout		130,425	94.3	
Two-party-preferred result
Liberal	Gerald Ashman	75,800	59.6	−0.3
Labor	Chrys Abraham	51,431	40.4	+0.3
Liberal hold		Swing	−0.3	

=== Melbourne ===
1996 Victorian state election: Melbourne Province
Party	Candidate	Votes	%	±%
Labor	Barry Pullen	70,215	54.9	+3.2
Liberal	Stuart McCraith	42,862	33.5	−2.1
Democrats	Robert Stone	10,766	8.4	+1.4
Democratic Labor	John Mulholland	2,283	1.8	−0.2
Natural Law	Ngaire Mason	1,701	1.3	−2.3
Total formal votes		127,827	96.9	+2.5
Informal votes		4,097	3.1	−2.5
Turnout		131,924	90.9	
Two-party-preferred result
Labor	Barry Pullen	81,343	63.8	+4.9
Liberal	Stuart McCraith	46,128	36.2	−4.9
Labor hold		Swing	+4.9	

=== Melbourne North ===
1996 Victorian state election: Melbourne North Province
Party	Candidate	Votes	%	±%
Labor	Caroline Hogg	71,022	57.7	+2.6
Liberal	Julie Beattie	44,334	36.0	−2.3
Democrats	Morris Moretta	4,762	3.9	+3.9
Democratic Labor	Hank Ferwerda	1,708	1.4	−5.3
Friendly Migrant Workers	Joseph Kaliniy	1,339	1.1	+1.1
Total formal votes		123,165	96.3	+2.2
Informal votes		4,699	3.7	−2.2
Turnout		127,864	94.0	
Two-party-preferred result
Labor	Caroline Hogg	75,831	61.7	+1.9
Liberal	Julie Beattie	47,131	38.3	−1.9
Labor hold		Swing	+1.9	

=== Melbourne West ===
1996 Victorian state election: Melbourne West Province
Party	Candidate	Votes	%	±%
Labor	Sang Nguyen	59,414	47.6	+2.7
Liberal	Chris MacGregor	41,861	33.5	+3.7
Independent	Les Twentyman	12,878	10.3	−12.6
Democratic Labor	Kevin Carroll	4,876	3.9	+1.6
Democrats	Alan Parker	3,867	3.1	+3.1
Natural Law	Panayiota Stamatopoulou	1,064	0.9	+0.9
Independent	Joe Santana	853	0.7	+0.7
Total formal votes		124,813	96.1	+1.4
Informal votes		5,053	3.9	−1.4
Turnout		129,866	93.7	
Two-party-preferred result
Labor	Sang Nguyen	76,203	61.2	+5.6
Liberal	Chris MacGregor	48,360	38.8	−5.6
Labor hold		Swing	+5.6	

=== Monash ===
1996 Victorian state election: Monash Province
Party	Candidate	Votes	%	±%
Liberal	Peter Katsambanis	66,966	51.7	−4.8
Labor	Nicholas Gold	49,805	38.5	+3.4
Democrats	Julie Peters	8,467	6.5	+6.5
Natural Law	Joan Dickins	2,451	1.9	+1.9
Democratic Labor	Terry O'Hanlon	1,036	0.8	−3.6
Independent	Jonathan Heath	767	0.6	+0.6
Total formal votes		129,492	97.6	+1.9
Informal votes		3,134	2.4	−1.9
Turnout		132,626	90.4	
Two-party-preferred result
Liberal	Peter Katsambanis	70,709	54.8	−5.5
Labor	Nicholas Gold	58,386	45.2	+5.5
Liberal hold		Swing	−5.5	

=== North Eastern ===
1996 Victorian state election: North Eastern Province
Party	Candidate	Votes	%	±%
National	Jeanette Powell	45,776	37.0	−31.3
Liberal	Glen Nichols	40,020	32.4	+32.4
Labor	Rachelle Valente	31,629	25.6	−1.0
Democrats	John Clarke	4,862	3.9	+3.9
Democratic Labor	Gavan Grimes	1,364	1.1	−4.0
Total formal votes		123,651	97.7	+0.7
Informal votes		2,854	2.3	−0.7
Turnout		126,505	94.6	
Two-candidate-preferred result
National	Jeanette Powell	76,220	61.8	−9.2
Liberal	Glen Nichols	47,027	38.2	+38.2
National hold		Swing	N/A	

=== North Western ===
1996 Victorian state election: North Western Province
Party	Candidate	Votes	%	±%
National	Ron Best	69,081	57.2	+2.1
Labor	Gary Thorn	40,796	33.8	+3.4
Democrats	Don Semmens	6,856	5.7	+5.7
Independent	Gary Schorel	2,473	2.0	+2.0
Democratic Labor	Peter Ferwerda	1,479	1.2	−0.7
Total formal votes		120,685	98.1	+0.7
Informal votes		2,375	1.9	−0.7
Turnout		123,060	94.9	
Two-party-preferred result
National	Ron Best	74,137	61.6	−3.5
Labor	Gary Thorn	46,181	38.4	+3.5
National hold		Swing	−3.5	

=== Silvan ===
1996 Victorian state election: Silvan Province
Party	Candidate	Votes	%	±%
Liberal	Wendy Smith	68,604	56.0	−1.7
Labor	Kathy Jackson	42,540	34.7	−1.3
Democrats	John McLaren	7,318	6.0	+6.0
Natural Law	Sue Cawthorn	1,928	1.6	+1.6
Democratic Labor	Alan Jansen	1,143	0.9	−5.3
Independent	Steve Raskovy	952	0.8	+0.8
Total formal votes		122,485	97.8	+1.2
Informal votes		2,748	2.2	−1.2
Turnout		125,233	95.0	
Two-party-preferred result
Liberal	Wendy Smith	73,821	60.4	+0.4
Labor	Kathy Jackson	48,423	39.6	−0.4
Liberal hold		Swing	+0.4	

=== South Eastern ===
1996 Victorian state election: South Eastern Province
Party	Candidate	Votes	%	±%
Liberal	Ken Smith	71,864	56.6	−0.6
Labor	Jude Perera	45,005	35.4	+2.0
Democrats	Glen Maddock	6,192	4.9	+4.9
Democratic Labor	Pat Crea	1,461	1.1	−2.4
Natural Law	Alan Shield	1,422	1.1	−4.8
Independent	Bill McCluskey	1,133	0.9	+0.9
Total formal votes		127,077	97.8	+1.3
Informal votes		2,846	2.2	−1.3
Turnout		129,923	94.9	
Two-party-preferred result
Liberal	Ken Smith	76,236	60.1	−2.2
Labor	Jude Perera	50,660	39.9	+2.2
Liberal hold		Swing	−2.2	

=== Templestowe ===
1996 Victorian state election: Templestowe Province
Party	Candidate	Votes	%	±%
Liberal	Carlo Furletti	70,405	54.8	−4.7
Labor	Heather Garth	45,196	35.2	+0.4
Democrats	Angela Carter	11,079	8.6	+8.6
Democratic Labor	Frances Murphy	1,867	1.5	−1.2
Total formal votes		128,547	97.7	+1.8
Informal votes		3,001	2.3	−1.8
Turnout		131,548	94.8	
Two-party-preferred result
Liberal	Carlo Furletti	75,925	59.2	−2.5
Labor	Heather Garth	52,392	40.8	+2.5
Liberal hold		Swing	−2.5	

=== Waverley ===
1996 Victorian state election: Waverley Province
Party	Candidate	Votes	%	±%
Liberal	Maree Luckins	62,281	50.9	−1.7
Labor	Garth Head	49,573	40.5	+1.2
Democrats	Richard Grummet	8,450	6.9	+6.9
Democratic Labor	Matt Cody	1,960	1.6	−2.2
Total formal votes		122,264	97.4	+2.5
Informal votes		3,266	2.6	−2.5
Turnout		125,530	94.0	
Two-party-preferred result
Liberal	Maree Luckins	66,917	54.8	−0.1
Labor	Garth Head	55,085	45.2	+0.1
Liberal gain from Labor		Swing	−0.1	

=== Western ===
1996 Victorian state election: Western Province
Party	Candidate	Votes	%	±%
Liberal	Bruce Chamberlain	73,811	60.5	+60.5
Labor	Elizabeth Wilson	37,351	30.6	+3.2
Democrats	Don Anderson	8,085	6.6	+6.6
Democratic Labor	Christine Dodd	2,837	2.3	−2.8
Total formal votes		122,084	98.2	+0.9
Informal votes		2,276	1.8	−0.9
Turnout		124,360	95.8	
Two-party-preferred result
Liberal	Bruce Chamberlain	78,769	64.7	−6.0
Labor	Elizabeth Wilson	42,897	35.3	+6.0
Liberal hold		Swing	−6.0	

== By-elections ==
1996 Victorian Legislative Council by-elections
← 1992 (none held)	30 March 1996	1999 →

1 seat in the Legislative Council
	First party
Party	Labor
Seats before	1
Seats won	1
Seat change	Steady

There was a Legislative Council by-election that took place on election day following the resignation of MLCs elected at the 1992 election.

=== Doutta Galla ===
1996 Victorian state election: Doutta Galla by-election
Party	Candidate	Votes	%	±%
Labor	Tayfun Eren	73,796	57.0	+5.6
Liberal	R McClymont	48,506	37.5	+1.3
Independent	S Bingle	7,103	5.5	+5.5
Total formal votes		129,405	95.6	+2.2
Informal votes		6,011	4.4	−2.2
Turnout		135,416	93.1	
Two-party-preferred result
Labor	Tayfun Eren	77,348	59.8	
Liberal	R McClymont	52,057	40.2	
Labor hold		Swing		

This election was caused by the vacancy following the resignation of David White, who unsuccessfully contested the lower house seat of Tullamarine.

== See also ==
- 1996 Victorian state election
- Members of the Victorian Legislative Council, 1996–1999
