= Electoral results for the Doutta Galla Province =

Victoria, Australia, district election results

This is a list of electoral results for the Doutta Galla Province in Victorian state elections.

== Members for Doutta Galla Province ==
Year	Member	Party	Member	Party
1937	Percy Clarey	Labor		
1940	Percy Clarey	Labor	Paul Jones	Labor
1943	Percy Clarey	Labor	Paul Jones	Labor
1946	Percy Clarey	Labor	Paul Jones	Labor
1949	Bill Slater	Labor	Paul Jones	Labor
1952	Bill Slater	Labor	Paul Jones	Labor
1955	Bill Slater	Labor	Paul Jones	Labor (A-C)
1955	Bill Slater	Labor	Paul Jones	Labor (A-C)
1958	Bill Slater	Labor	Samuel Merrifield	Labor
1960	John Tripovich	Labor	Samuel Merrifield	Labor
1961	John Tripovich	Labor	Samuel Merrifield	Labor
1964	John Tripovich	Labor	Samuel Merrifield	Labor
1967	John Tripovich	Labor	Samuel Merrifield	Labor
1970	John Tripovich	Labor	Dolph Eddy	Labor
1973	John Tripovich	Labor	Dolph Eddy	Labor
1976	John Tripovich	Labor	Bill Landeryou	Labor
1976	David White	Labor	Bill Landeryou	Labor
1979	David White	Labor	Bill Landeryou	Labor
1982	David White	Labor	Bill Landeryou	Labor
1985	David White	Labor	Bill Landeryou	Labor
1988	David White	Labor	Bill Landeryou	Labor
1992	David White	Labor	Bill Landeryou	Labor
1993	David White	Labor	John Brumby	Labor
1993	David White	Labor	Monica Gould	Labor
1996	Tayfun Eren	Labor	Monica Gould	Labor
1999	Justin Madden	Labor	Monica Gould	Labor
2002	Justin Madden	Labor	Monica Gould	Labor

== Election results ==
=== Elections in the 2000s ===
2002 Victorian state election: Doutta Galla Province
Party	Candidate	Votes	%	±%
Labor	Monica Gould	84,236	66.1	−0.4
Liberal	Christina Tutone	31,808	24.9	−8.6
Greens	Jules Beckwith	8,714	6.8	+6.8
Democrats	Robert Livesay	2,753	2.2	+2.2
Total formal votes		127,511	94.6	−0.3
Informal votes		7,210	5.4	+0.3
Turnout		134,721	93.1	
Two-party-preferred result
Labor	Monica Gould	91,581	71.9	+5.5
Liberal	Christina Tutone	35,797	28.1	−5.5
Labor hold		Swing	+5.5	

=== Elections in the 1990s ===
1999 Victorian state election: Doutta Galla Province
Party	Candidate	Votes	%	±%
Labor	Justin Madden	93,833	65.6	+7.8
Liberal	Philip Daw	49,202	34.4	−1.8
Total formal votes		143,035	95.1	−0.6
Informal votes		7,441	4.9	+0.6
Turnout		150,476	95.0	
Labor hold		Swing	+4.4	

1996 Victorian state election: Doutta Galla by-election
Party	Candidate	Votes	%	±%
Labor	Tayfun Eren	73,796	57.0	+5.6
Liberal	R McClymont	48,506	37.5	+1.3
Independent	S Bingle	7,103	5.5	+5.5
Total formal votes		129,405	95.6	+2.2
Informal votes		6,011	4.4	−2.2
Turnout		135,416	93.1	
Two-party-preferred result
Labor	Tayfun Eren	77,348	59.8	
Liberal	R McClymont	52,057	40.2	
Labor hold		Swing		

This election was caused by the vacancy following the resignation of David White, who unsuccessfully contested the lower house seat of Tullamarine.

1996 Victorian state election: Doutta Galla Province
Party	Candidate	Votes	%	±%
Labor	Monica Gould	75,717	57.8	+6.4
Liberal	Jody Allatt	47,467	36.2	+0.1
Democrats	John Davey	4,782	3.7	+3.7
Democratic Labor	Gloria Brook	2,997	2.3	−4.4
Total formal votes		130,963	95.6	+2.3
Informal votes		5,984	4.4	−2.3
Turnout		136,947	94.1	
Two-party-preferred result
Labor	Monica Gould	79,968	61.2	+3.2
Liberal	Jody Allatt	50,727	38.8	−3.2
Labor hold		Swing	+3.2	

September 1993 Doutta Galla Province state by-election
Party	Candidate	Votes	%	±%
Labor	Monica Gould	76,441	70.1	+18.7
Independent	Stephen Bingle	32,666	29.9	+29.9
Total formal votes		109,107	90.5	−2.8
Informal votes		11,431	9.5	+2.8
Turnout		120,538	77.8	−17.8
Labor hold		Swing	N/A	

- This by-election was caused by the resignation of John Brumby, who successfully contested the 1993 Broadmeadows state by-election and moved to the Lower House after being elected leader of the Labor party.

February 1993 Doutta Galla Province state by-election
Party	Candidate	Votes	%	±%
Labor	John Brumby	75,299	68.3	+16.9
Independent	Z A Derwinski	17,769	16.1	+16.1
Democrats	Kathie Gizycki	17,213	15.6	+15.6
Total formal votes		110,281	91.2	−2.1
Informal votes		10,703	8.8	+2.1
Turnout		120,984	78.8	−16.2
Labor hold		Swing	N/A	

- This by-election was caused by the resignation of Bill Landeryou. Preferences were not distributed.

1992 Victorian state election: Doutta Galla Province
Party	Candidate	Votes	%	±%
Labor	David White	60,466	51.4	−7.6
Liberal	George Korytsky	42,551	36.2	−4.7
Democratic Labor	Gloria Brook	7,837	6.7	+6.7
Independent	Glenn Campbell	6,772	5.8	+5.8
Total formal votes		117,626	93.3	+1.3
Informal votes		8,394	6.7	−1.3
Turnout		126,020	95.0	
Two-party-preferred result
Labor	David White	68,027	58.0	−1.1
Liberal	George Korytsky	49,257	42.0	+1.1
Labor hold		Swing	−1.1	

=== Elections in the 1980s ===
1988 Victorian state election: Doutta Galla Province
Party	Candidate	Votes	%	±%
Labor	Bill Landeryou	66,700	58.9	−5.0
Liberal	Graeme Cameron	46,629	41.1	+5.0
Total formal votes		113,329	92.3	−2.9
Informal votes		9,463	7.7	+2.9
Turnout		122,792	92.7	−1.5
Labor hold		Swing	−5.0	

1985 Victorian state election: Doutta Galla Province
Party	Candidate	Votes	%	±%
Labor	David White	68,820	63.9	
Liberal	Pamela Philpot	38,898	36.1	
Total formal votes		107,718	95.2	
Informal votes		5,462	4.8	
Turnout		113,180	94.2	
Labor hold		Swing	−6.0	

1982 Victorian state election: Doutta Galla Province
Party	Candidate	Votes	%	±%
Labor	Bill Landeryou	86,361	66.0	+7.5
Liberal	Pamela Philpot	44,518	34.0	−7.5
Total formal votes		130,879	95.1	+0.1
Informal votes		6,705	4.9	−0.1
Turnout		137,584	94.9	+0.6
Labor hold		Swing	+7.5	

=== Elections in the 1970s ===
1979 Victorian state election: Doutta Galla Province
Party	Candidate	Votes	%	±%
Labor	David White	69,342	58.5	+4.9
Liberal	Claus Salger	49,192	41.5	−4.9
Total formal votes		118,534	95.0	+0.7
Informal votes		6,246	5.0	−0.7
Turnout		124,780	94.3	+0.5
Labor hold		Swing	+4.9	

1976 Doutta Galla Province state by-election
Party	Candidate	Votes	%	±%
Labor	David White	60,684	57.2	+3.6
Liberal	Geoffrey Lutz	38,606	36.4	−10.0
Independent	David A White	6,849	6.5	+6.5
Total formal votes		106,139	96.4	+0.7
Informal votes		3,955	3.6	−0.7
Turnout		110,094	N/A	N/A
Labor hold		Swing	N/A	

- This by-election was caused by the death of John Tripovich. Preferences were not distributed.

1976 Victorian state election: Doutta Galla Province
Party	Candidate	Votes	%	±%
Labor	Bill Landeryou	58,121	53.6	
Liberal	Rex Webb	50,384	46.4	
Total formal votes		108,505	95.7	
Informal votes		4,926	4.3	
Turnout		113,431	93.8	
Labor hold		Swing		

1973 Victorian state election: Doutta Galla Province
Party	Candidate	Votes	%	±%
Labor	John Tripovich	67,210	51.9	−2.8
Liberal	Frank Mott	43,441	33.5	+3.6
Democratic Labor	Hubert Evans	18,850	14.6	−0.8
Total formal votes		129,501	94.1	−0.2
Informal votes		8,132	5.9	+0.2
Turnout		137,633	93.7	0.0
Two-party-preferred result
Labor	John Tripovich		53.3	−2.9
Liberal	Frank Mott		46.7	+2.9
Labor hold		Swing	−2.9	

- Two party preferred vote was estimated.

1970 Victorian state election: Doutta Galla Province
Party	Candidate	Votes	%	±%
Labor	Dolph Eddy	60,974	54.7	+4.9
Liberal	William Pearce	33,348	29.9	−4.6
Democratic Labor	Hubert Evans	17,135	15.4	−0.3
Total formal votes		111,457	94.3	−0.3
Informal votes		6,786	5.7	+0.3
Turnout		118,243	93.7	+0.2
Two-party-preferred result
Labor	Dolph Eddy		56.2	+4.8
Liberal	William Pearce		43.8	−4.8
Labor hold		Swing	+4.8	

- Two party preferred vote was estimated.

=== Elections in the 1960s ===
1967 Victorian state election: Doutta Galla Province
Party	Candidate	Votes	%	±%
Labor	John Tripovich	53,073	49.8	
Liberal	Gabrielle Adams	36,831	34.5	
Democratic Labor	Alfred Gerrard	16,731	15.7	
Total formal votes		106,635	94.6	
Informal votes		6,140	5.4	
Turnout		112,775	93.5	
Two-party-preferred result
Labor	John Tripovich	54,784	51.4	
Liberal	Gabrielle Adams	51,851	48.6	
Labor hold		Swing		

1964 Victorian state election: Doutta Galla Province
Party	Candidate	Votes	%	±%
Labor	Samuel Merrifield	45,486	49.3	+0.6
Liberal and Country	Victor French	30,810	33.4	+2.0
Democratic Labor	Peter McCabe	15,886	17.2	−2.7
Total formal votes		92,182	95.6	+0.3
Informal votes		4,237	4.4	−0.3
Turnout		96,419	94.0	+0.4
Two-party-preferred result
Labor	Samuel Merrifield	47,120	51.1	+0.6
Liberal and Country	Victor French	45,062	48.9	−0.6
Labor hold		Swing	+0.6	

1961 Victorian state election: Doutta Galla Province
Party	Candidate	Votes	%	±%
Labor	John Tripovich	44,708	48.7	−4.3
Liberal and Country	Kenneth Jones	28,895	31.4	+0.3
Democratic Labor	Barry O'Brien	18,300	19.9	+3.9
Total formal votes		91,903	95.3	−2.8
Informal votes		4,489	4.7	+2.8
Turnout		96,392	93.6	+1.6
Two-party-preferred result
Labor	John Tripovich	46,391	50.5	−5.7
Liberal and Country	Kenneth Jones	45,512	49.5	+5.7
Labor hold		Swing	−5.7	

1960 Doutta Galla Province state by-election
Party	Candidate	Votes	%	±%
Labor	John Tripovich	52,892	65.9	+12.9
Democratic Labor	Barry O'Brien	27,359	34.1	+18.1
Total formal votes		80,251	96.2	−1.9
Informal votes		3,195	3.8	+1.9
Turnout		83,446	80.6	−11.4
Labor hold		Swing	N/A	

- This by-election was caused by the death of Bill Slater.

=== Elections in the 1950s ===
1958 Victorian Legislative Council election: Doutta Galla Province
Party	Candidate	Votes	%	±%
Labor	Samuel Merrifield	50,548	53.0	−17.5
Liberal and Country	Nicholas Dawe	29,656	31.1	+31.1
Democratic Labor	Herbert Morris	15,219	16.0	−13.5
Total formal votes		95,423	98.1	+1.4
Informal votes		1,858	1.9	−1.4
Turnout		97,281	92.0	+1.0
Two-party-preferred result
Labor	Samuel Merrifield		56.2	
Liberal and Country	Nicholas Dawe		43.8	
Labor gain from Democratic Labor		Swing	N/A	

- Two party preferred vote was estimated.
