= Members of the Victorian Legislative Council, 1996–1999 =

- ←1992–1996 1999–2002→

This is a list of members of the Victorian Legislative Council between 1996 and 1999. As half of the Legislative Council faced election at each general election until 2006, one half of these members were elected at the 1992 state election, while the other half was elected at the 1996 state election.

| Name | Party | Province | First elected |
|---|---|---|---|
| Hon Louise Asher | Liberal | Monash | 1992–1999 |
| Gerald Ashman | Liberal | Koonung | 1988–2002 |
| Bruce Atkinson | Liberal | Koonung | 1992–present |
| Bill Baxter | National | North Eastern | 1978–1984, 1985–2006 |
| Ron Best | National | North Western | 1988–2002 |
| Hon Mark Birrell | Liberal | East Yarra | 1983–2002 |
| Barry Bishop | National | North Western | 1992–2006 |
| Cameron Boardman | Liberal | Chelsea | 1996–2002 |
| Ron Bowden | Liberal | South Eastern | 1992–2006 |
| Andrew Brideson | Liberal | Waverley | 1992–2006 |
| Hon Bruce Chamberlain | Liberal | Western | 1976–2002 |
| Ian Cover | Liberal | Geelong | 1996–2002 |
| Hon Geoff Craige | Liberal | Central Highlands | 1988–2002 |
| David Davis | Liberal | East Yarra | 1996–present |
| Philip Davis | Liberal | Gippsland | 1992–2014 |
| Tayfun Eren | Labor | Doutta Galla | 1996–1999 |
| Dick de Fegely | Liberal | Ballarat | 1985–1999 |
| Bill Forwood | Liberal | Templestowe | 1992–2006 |
| Carlo Furletti | Liberal | Templestowe | 1996–2002 |
| Hon Monica Gould | Labor | Doutta Galla | 1993–2006 |
| Peter Hall | National | Gippsland | 1988–2014 |
| Hon Roger Hallam | National | Western | 1985–2002 |
| Bill Hartigan | Liberal | Geelong | 1992–1999 |
| Hon Caroline Hogg | Labor | Melbourne North | 1982–1999 |
| Peter Katsambanis | Liberal | Monash | 1996–2002 |
| Hon Rob Knowles | Liberal | Ballarat | 1976–1999 |
| Neil Lucas | Liberal | Eumemmerring | 1996–2002 |
| Maree Luckins | Liberal | Waverley | 1996–2002 |
| Jean McLean | Labor | Melbourne West | 1985–1999 |
| Don Nardella | Labor | Melbourne North | 1992–1999 |
| Sang Nguyen | Labor | Melbourne West | 1996–2006 |
| Jeanette Powell | National | North Eastern | 1996–2002 |
| Pat Power | Labor | Jika Jika | 1992–1999 |
| Hon Barry Pullen | Labor | Melbourne | 1982–1999 |
| Dr John Ross | Liberal | Higinbotham | 1996–2002 |
| Ken Smith | Liberal | South Eastern | 1988–2002 |
| Wendy Smith | Liberal | Silvan | 1996–2002 |
| Graeme Stoney | Liberal | Central Highlands | 1992–2006 |
| Chris Strong | Liberal | Higinbotham | 1992–2006 |
| Hon Theo Theophanous | Labor | Jika Jika | 1988–2010 |
| Doug Walpole | Labor | Melbourne | 1992–1999 |
| Dr Ron Wells | Liberal | Eumemmerring | 1992–1999 |
| Rosemary Varty | Liberal | Silvan | 1985–1999 |
| Sue Wilding | Liberal | Chelsea | 1992–1999 |
