= Results of the 1992 Victorian state election (Legislative Council) =

Australian state election results

Victorian state election, 3 October 1992 Legislative Council << 1988–1996 >>
Enrolled voters	2,855,471				
Votes cast	2,718,936		Turnout	95.22	+2.89
Informal votes	111,627		Informal	4.11	–0.22
Summary of votes by party
Party	Primary votes	%	Swing	Seats won	Seats held
Liberal	1,133,951	43.49	–0.01	14	24
Labor	1,005,454	38.56	–9.57	5	14
National	227,850	8.74	+1.26	3	6
Democratic Labor	118,244	4.54	+4.54	0	0
Natural Law	16,216	0.62	+0.62	0	0
Geelong Community Alliance	14,586	0.56	+0.56	0	0
Democrats	8,197	0.31	+0.31	0	0
Call to Australia	2,168	0.08	–0.14	0	0
Independent	80,643	3.09	+2.42	0	0
Total	2,419,991			22	44
Two-party-preferred
Liberal/National	1,475,004	56.65	+6.10		
Labor	1,128,503	43.35	–6.10		

This is a list of Legislative Council results for the Victorian 1992 state election. 22 of the 44 seats were contested.

== Results by province ==
=== Ballarat ===
1992 Victorian state election: Ballarat Province
Party	Candidate	Votes	%	±%
Liberal	Dick de Fegely	62,482	53.9	+5.2
Labor	Geoff Howard	47,384	40.9	−3.3
Democratic Labor	Brian Lugar	6,110	5.3	+5.3
Total formal votes		115,976	97.1	−0.5
Informal votes		3,488	2.9	+0.5
Turnout		119,464	96.2	
Two-party-preferred result
Liberal	Dick de Fegely	64,166	55.3	+0.9
Labor	Geoff Howard	51,763	44.7	−0.9
Liberal hold		Swing	+0.9	

=== Central Highlands ===
1992 Victorian state election: Central Highlands Province
Party	Candidate	Votes	%	±%
Liberal	Graeme Stoney	69,009	58.5	+18.8
Labor	Janet Kaylock	41,891	35.5	−8.2
Democratic Labor	Rosemary Maurus	7,072	6.0	+6.0
Total formal votes		117,972	96.7	−0.1
Informal votes		4,040	3.3	+0.1
Turnout		122,012	96.3	
Two-party-preferred result
Liberal	Graeme Stoney	71,733	60.9	+7.7
Labor	Janet Kaylock	46,099	39.1	−7.7
Liberal hold		Swing	+7.7	

=== Chelsea ===
1992 Victorian state election: Chelsea Province
Party	Candidate	Votes	%	±%
Liberal	Sue Wilding	58,108	49.9	+4.7
Labor	Maureen Lyster	47,127	40.5	−11.4
Independent	Judith O'Dwyer	5,929	5.1	+5.1
Democratic Labor	John Cass	5,199	4.5	+4.5
Total formal votes		116,363	95.5	+0.4
Informal votes		5,455	4.5	−0.4
Turnout		121,818	95.3	
Two-party-preferred result
Liberal	Sue Wilding	62,868	54.2	+7.6
Labor	Maureen Lyster	53,161	45.8	−7.6
Liberal gain from Labor		Swing	+7.6	

=== Doutta Galla ===
1992 Victorian state election: Doutta Galla Province
Party	Candidate	Votes	%	±%
Labor	David White	60,466	51.4	−7.6
Liberal	George Korytsky	42,551	36.2	−4.7
Democratic Labor	Gloria Brook	7,837	6.7	+6.7
Independent	Glenn Campbell	6,772	5.8	+5.8
Total formal votes		117,626	93.3	+1.3
Informal votes		8,394	6.7	−1.3
Turnout		126,020	95.0	
Two-party-preferred result
Labor	David White	68,027	58.0	−1.1
Liberal	George Korytsky	49,257	42.0	+1.1
Labor hold		Swing	−1.1	

=== East Yarra ===
1992 Victorian state election: East Yarra Province
Party	Candidate	Votes	%	±%
Liberal	Mark Birrell	78,005	63.5	+5.5
Labor	Rosemary Barker	37,038	30.1	−11.8
Democratic Labor	Margaret Reed	7,840	6.4	+6.4
Total formal votes		122,883	96.8	+0.3
Informal votes		4,068	3.2	−0.3
Turnout		126,951	94.5	
Two-party-preferred result
Liberal	Mark Birrell	81,579	66.4	+8.4
Labor	Rosemary Barker	41,191	33.6	−8.4
Liberal hold		Swing	+8.4	

=== Eumemmerring ===
1992 Victorian state election: Eumemmerring Province
Party	Candidate	Votes	%	±%
Liberal	Ron Wells	60,726	52.6	+6.0
Labor	Fred Van Buren	47,554	41.2	−11.9
Democratic Labor	Timothy Dodd	7,115	6.2	+6.2
Total formal votes		115,395	94.9	+0.6
Informal votes		6,237	5.1	−0.6
Turnout		121,632	95.2	
Two-party-preferred result
Liberal	Ron Wells	63,396	55.1	+8.3
Labor	Fred Van Buren	51,745	44.9	−8.3
Liberal gain from Labor		Swing	+8.3	

=== Geelong ===
1992 Victorian state election: Geelong Province
Party	Candidate	Votes	%	±%
Liberal	Bill Hartigan	52,698	44.5	+2.0
Labor	Jan Alen	47,263	39.9	−8.6
Geelong Community	Rod Mackenzie	14,586	12.3	+12.3
Call to Australia	Ian Winter	2,168	1.8	−3.0
Democratic Labor	Paul Cahill	1,713	1.4	+1.4
Total formal votes		118,428	96.5	0.0
Informal votes		4,318	3.5	0.0
Turnout		122,746	95.5	
Two-party-preferred result
Liberal	Bill Hartigan	62,863	53.2	+4.3
Labor	Jan Alen	55,346	46.8	−4.3
Liberal gain from Labor		Swing	+4.3	

=== Gippsland ===
1992 Victorian state election: Gippsland Province
Party	Candidate	Votes	%	±%
Liberal	Philip Davis	62,713	52.5	+23.9
Labor	Judith Stone	39,235	32.8	−4.7
Independent	Paul Newnham	7,398	6.2	+6.2
Independent	Ben Buckley	5,522	4.6	+4.6
Democratic Labor	Michael Rowe	4,691	3.9	+3.9
Total formal votes		119,559	97.3	+0.2
Informal votes		3,313	2.7	−0.2
Turnout		122,872	95.8	
Two-party-preferred result
Liberal	Philip Davis	73,891	61.9	+3.9
Labor	Judith Stone	45,489	38.1	−3.9
Liberal hold		Swing	+3.9	

=== Higinbotham ===
1992 Victorian state election: Higinbotham Province
Party	Candidate	Votes	%	±%
Liberal	Chris Strong	74,382	62.0	+7.2
Labor	Thomas Hickie	37,182	31.0	−13.5
Natural Law	Edward Havard	5,088	4.2	+4.2
Democratic Labor	Gail de Rozario	3,288	2.7	+2.7
Total formal votes		119,940	96.4	−0.1
Informal votes		4,488	3.6	+0.1
Turnout		124,428	94.7	
Two-party-preferred result
Liberal	Chris Strong	77,462	64.7	+9.5
Labor	Thomas Hickie	42,345	35.3	−9.5
Liberal hold		Swing	+9.5	

=== Jika Jika ===
1992 Victorian state election: Jika Jika Province
Party	Candidate	Votes	%	±%
Labor	Pat Power	66,472	55.5	−9.7
Liberal	Gregory Eade	44,217	36.9	+2.1
Democratic Labor	Leonard Moore	9,114	7.6	+7.6
Total formal votes		119,803	94.5	+1.2
Informal votes		7,008	5.5	−1.2
Turnout		126,811	94.7	
Two-party-preferred result
Labor	Pat Power	73,325	61.3	−3.9
Liberal	Gregory Eade	46,301	38.7	+3.9
Labor hold		Swing	−3.9	

=== Koonung ===
1992 Victorian state election: Koonung Province
Party	Candidate	Votes	%	±%
Liberal	Bruce Atkinson	69,900	57.8	+7.4
Labor	Sharon Ellis	44,525	36.8	−12.8
Democratic Labor	Peter Ferwerda	6,429	5.3	+5.3
Total formal votes		120,854	96.2	0.0
Informal votes		4,830	3.8	0.0
Turnout		125,684	95.7	
Two-party-preferred result
Liberal	Bruce Atkinson	72,374	59.9	+9.5
Labor	Sharon Ellis	48,361	40.1	−9.5
Liberal gain from Labor		Swing	+9.5	

=== Melbourne ===
1992 Victorian state election: Melbourne Province
Party	Candidate	Votes	%	±%
Labor	Doug Walpole	60,570	51.7	−13.6
Liberal	John Miles	41,684	35.6	+0.9
Democrats	Robert Stone	8,197	7.0	+7.0
Natural Law	Ngaire Mason	4,298	3.7	+3.7
Democratic Labor	John Mulholland	2,312	2.0	+2.0
Total formal votes		117,061	94.4	+1.0
Informal votes		6,890	5.6	−1.0
Turnout		123,951	92.0	
Two-party-preferred result
Labor	Doug Walpole	68,723	58.9	−6.4
Liberal	John Miles	48,016	41.1	+6.4
Labor hold		Swing	−6.4	

=== Melbourne North ===
1992 Victorian state election: Melbourne North Province
Party	Candidate	Votes	%	±%
Labor	Don Nardella	62,132	55.0	−7.5
Liberal	Alice Collis	43,220	38.3	+1.3
Democratic Labor	Mark Beshara	7,569	6.7	+6.7
Total formal votes		112,921	94.1	+0.9
Informal votes		7,040	5.9	−0.9
Turnout		119,961	94.4	
Two-party-preferred result
Labor	Don Nardella	67,458	59.8	−2.8
Liberal	Alice Collis	45,274	40.2	+2.8
Labor hold		Swing	−2.8	

=== Melbourne West ===
1992 Victorian state election: Melbourne West Province
Party	Candidate	Votes	%	±%
Labor	Jean McLean	51,960	44.9	−18.2
Liberal	Patricia Vejby	34,543	29.9	−7.0
Independent	Les Twentyman	26,499	22.9	+22.9
Democratic Labor	Maurice Allen	2,693	2.3	+2.3
Total formal votes		115,695	94.7	+1.7
Informal votes		6,520	5.3	−1.7
Turnout		122,215	95.2	
Two-party-preferred result
Labor	Jean McLean	64,176	55.6	−7.5
Liberal	Patricia Vejby	51,199	44.4	+7.5
Labor hold		Swing	−7.5	

=== Monash ===
1992 Victorian state election: Monash Province
Party	Candidate	Votes	%	±%
Liberal	Louise Asher	69,705	56.5	+4.9
Labor	Bunna Walsh	43,217	35.0	−13.4
Democratic Labor	Robert Semmel	5,463	4.4	+4.4
Independent	James Moffatt	4,982	4.0	+4.0
Total formal votes		123,367	95.8	+0.4
Informal votes		5,470	4.2	−0.4
Turnout		128,837	93.7	
Two-party-preferred result
Liberal	Louise Asher	74,292	60.3	+8.7
Labor	Bunna Walsh	48,862	39.7	−8.7
Liberal hold		Swing	+8.7	

=== North Eastern ===
1992 Victorian state election: North Eastern Province
Party	Candidate	Votes	%	±%
National	Bill Baxter	80,883	68.3	+20.4
Labor	Ewan Paterson	31,526	26.6	−0.7
Democratic Labor	Pauline MacGibbon	6,041	5.1	+5.1
Total formal votes		118,450	97.0	−0.5
Informal votes		3,638	3.0	+0.5
Turnout		122,088	95.5	
Two-party-preferred result
National	Bill Baxter	84,065	71.0	−0.2
Labor	Ewan Paterson	34,378	29.0	+0.2
National hold		Swing	−0.2	

=== North Western ===
1992 Victorian state election: North Western Province
Party	Candidate	Votes	%	±%
National	Barry Bishop	64,950	55.2	+17.3
Labor	Bob Cameron	35,760	30.4	−3.8
Independent	Elizabeth Cox	14,677	12.5	+12.5
Democratic Labor	Gavan Grimes	2,297	2.0	+2.0
Total formal votes		117,684	97.4	−0.3
Informal votes		3,119	2.6	+0.3
Turnout		120,803	96.1	
Two-party-preferred result
National	Barry Bishop	76,641	65.1	+2.3
Labor	Bob Cameron	41,004	34.9	−2.3
National hold		Swing	+2.3	

=== Silvan ===
1992 Victorian state election: Silvan Province
Party	Candidate	Votes	%	±%
Liberal	Rosemary Varty	67,485	57.7	+8.4
Labor	Eugene O'Sullivan	42,139	36.1	−13.2
Democratic Labor	Paul McCarthy	7,251	6.2	+6.2
Total formal votes		116,875	96.6	−0.1
Informal votes		4,053	3.4	+0.1
Turnout		120,928	95.3	
Two-party-preferred result
Liberal	Rosemary Varty	70,087	60.0	+9.6
Labor	Eugene O'Sullivan	46,677	40.0	−9.6
Liberal hold		Swing	+9.6	

=== South Eastern ===
1992 Victorian state election: South Eastern Province
Party	Candidate	Votes	%	±%
Liberal	Ron Bowden	66,314	57.1	+3.4
Labor	Chrys Abraham	38,811	33.4	−12.7
Natural Law	Alan Shield	6,830	5.9	+5.9
Democratic Labor	Patrick Crea	4,178	3.6	+3.6
Total formal votes		116,133	96.5	−0.1
Informal votes		4,187	3.5	+0.1
Turnout		120,320	95.8	
Two-party-preferred result
Liberal	Ron Bowden	72,223	62.3	+8.5
Labor	Chrys Abraham	43,738	37.7	−8.5
Liberal hold		Swing	+8.5	

=== Templestowe ===
1992 Victorian state election: Templestowe Province
Party	Candidate	Votes	%	±%
Liberal	Bill Forwood	73,029	59.4	+8.1
Labor	Desmond Johnson	42,734	34.8	−13.8
Independent	Richard Fitzherbert	3,899	3.2	+3.2
Democratic Labor	Valda McCarthy	3,231	2.6	+2.6
Total formal votes		122,893	95.9	0.0
Informal votes		5,190	4.1	0.0
Turnout		128,083	95.6	
Two-party-preferred result
Liberal	Bill Forwood	75,741	61.7	+10.3
Labor	Desmond Johnson	47,032	38.3	−10.3
Liberal hold		Swing	+10.3	

=== Waverley ===
1992 Victorian state election: Waverley Province
Party	Candidate	Votes	%	±%
Liberal	Andrew Brideson	63,180	52.6	+4.6
Labor	Cyril Kennedy	47,270	39.4	−12.6
Democratic Labor	Matthew Cody	4,615	3.8	+3.8
Independent	Elizabeth Billing	3,349	2.8	+2.8
Independent	Stephen Bingle	1,616	1.3	+1.3
Total formal votes		120,030	94.9	−0.1
Informal votes		6,420	5.1	+0.1
Turnout		126,450	96.0	
Two-party-preferred result
Liberal	Andrew Brideson	65,806	54.9	+6.9
Labor	Cyril Kennedy	54,013	45.1	−6.9
Liberal gain from Labor		Swing	+6.9	

=== Western ===
1992 Victorian state election: Western Province
Party	Candidate	Votes	%	±%
National	Roger Hallam	82,017	67.6	+45.9
Labor	David Broderick	33,198	27.3	−0.7
Democratic Labor	Christine Dodd	6,186	5.1	+5.1
Total formal votes		121,401	97.2	−0.7
Informal votes		3,461	2.8	+0.7
Turnout		124,862	96.6	
Two-party-preferred result
National	Roger Hallam	85,770	70.7	+70.7
Labor	David Broderick	35,590	29.3	−2.0
National hold		Swing	+2.0	

== See also ==
- 1992 Victorian state election
- Members of the Victorian Legislative Council, 1992–1996
