= Members of the Victorian Legislative Council, 1999–2002 =

- ←1996–1999 2002–2006→

This is a list of members of the Victorian Legislative Council between 1999 and 2002. As half of the Legislative Council faced election at each general election until 2006, one half of these members were elected at the 1996 state election, while the other half was elected at the 1999 state election.

Name	Party	Province	First elected
Gerald Ashman	Liberal	Koonung	1988–2002
Bruce Atkinson	Liberal	Koonung	1992–present
Bill Baxter	National	North Eastern	1978–1984, 1985–2006
Ron Best	National	North Western	1988–2002
Hon Mark Birrell	Liberal	East Yarra	1983–2002
Barry Bishop	National	North Western	1992–2006
Cameron Boardman	Liberal	Chelsea	1996–2002
Ron Bowden	Liberal	South Eastern	1992–2006
Andrew Brideson	Liberal	Waverley	1992–2006
Hon Candy Broad	Labor	Melbourne North	1999–2014
Elaine Carbines	Labor	Geelong	1999–2006
Hon Bruce Chamberlain	Liberal	Western	1976–2002
Andrea Coote	Liberal	Monash	1999–2014
Ian Cover	Liberal	Geelong	1996–2002
Hon Geoff Craige	Liberal	Central Highlands	1988–2002
Kaye Darveniza	Labor	Melbourne West	1999–2014
David Davis	Liberal	East Yarra	1996–present
Philip Davis	Liberal	Gippsland	1992–2014
Bill Forwood	Liberal	Templestowe	1992–2006
Carlo Furletti	Liberal	Templestowe	1996–2002
Hon Monica Gould	Labor	Doutta Galla	1993–2006
Dianne Hadden	Labor	Ballarat	1999–2006
Peter Hall	National	Gippsland	1988–2014
Hon Roger Hallam	National	Western	1985–2002
Gavin Jennings	Labor	Melbourne	1999–2020
Peter Katsambanis	Liberal	Monash	1996–2002
Neil Lucas	Liberal	Eumemmerring	1996–2002
Maree Luckins	Liberal	Waverley	1996–2002
John McQuilten	Labor	Ballarat	1999–2006
Hon Justin Madden	Labor	Doutta Galla	1999–2010
Hon Jenny Mikakos	Labor	Jika Jika	1999–2020
Sang Nguyen	Labor	Melbourne West	1996–2006
Andrew Olexander	Liberal	Silvan	1999–2006
Jeanette Powell	National	North Eastern	1996–2002
Gordon Rich-Phillips	Liberal	Eumemmerring	1999–present
Glenyys Romanes	Labor	Melbourne	1999–2006
Dr John Ross	Liberal	Higinbotham	1996–2002
Bob Smith	Labor	Chelsea	1999–2010
Ken Smith	Liberal	South Eastern	1988–2002
Wendy Smith	Liberal	Silvan	1996–2002
Graeme Stoney	Liberal	Central Highlands	1992–2006
Chris Strong	Liberal	Higinbotham	1992–2006
Hon Theo Theophanous	Labor	Jika Jika	1988–2010
Hon Marsha Thomson	Labor	Melbourne North	1999–2006
