= Candidates of the 1996 Victorian state election =

The 1996 Victorian state election was held on 30 March 1996.

== Retiring Members ==
- A by-election to replace Kelvin Thomson, the Labor member for Pascoe Vale who had resigned to run for the federal election, had been scheduled but was cancelled when the state election was called. The by-election to replace Bob Sercombe, the Labor member for Niddrie who had resigned under similar circumstances, had resulted in the unopposed election of Rob Hulls.

=== Labor ===
- Ken Coghill MLA (Werribee)
- Gerard Vaughan MLA (Clayton) - lost preselection
- David Henshaw MLC (Geelong)
- Licia Kokocinski MLC (Melbourne West) — lost preselection
- Brian Mier MLC (Waverley)

=== Liberal ===
- John Delzoppo MLA (Narracan)
- Don Hayward MLA (Prahran)
- Tony Hyams MLA (Dromana)
- Ted Tanner MLA (Caulfield)
- Graeme Weideman MLA (Frankston)
- Geoffrey Connard MLC (Higinbotham)
- George Cox MLC (Nunawading)
- James Guest MLC (Monash)
- Bruce Skeggs MLC (Templestowe)
- Haddon Storey MLC (East Yarra)

=== National ===
- David Evans MLC (North Eastern)

== Legislative Assembly ==
Sitting members are shown in bold text. Successful candidates are highlighted in the relevant colour. Where there is possible confusion, an asterisk (*) is also used.

| Electorate | Held by | Labor candidates | Coalition candidates | Natural Law candidates | Other candidates |
|---|---|---|---|---|---|
| Albert Park | Labor | **John Thwaites** | Eacham Curry (Lib) | Heath Allison | |
| Altona | Labor | Lynne Kosky | Teresa Thompson (Lib) | Marco Andreacchio | |
| Ballarat East | Liberal | Frank Sheehan | **Barry Traynor** (Lib) | Alan McDonald | Ralph Manno (Ind); Ray Suttie (CTA) |
| Ballarat West | Liberal | Robyn Mason | **Paul Jenkins** (Lib) | Peter Smith | Jodie Rickard (CTA) |
| Bayswater | Liberal | Barbara Lewis | **Gordon Ashley** (Lib) | Maggie Lawrence | |
| Bellarine | Liberal | Elaine Carbines | **Garry Spry** (Lib) | | |
| Benalla | National | Zuvele Leschen | **Pat McNamara** (Nat) | James Charlwood | Brian Hill (Ind); Brian Lumsden (Ind) |
| Benambra | Liberal | Michael Deuis | **Tony Plowman** (Lib) | Roslyn Johnson | |
| Bendigo East | Liberal | Julie Flynn | **Michael John** (Lib) | Susan Griffith | Geoff Ferns (Ind) |
| Bendigo West | Liberal | Bob Cameron | **Max Turner** (Lib) | Robert Freethy | Karen Brown (Ind); Willi Carney (Ind); Tom Comini (SP) |
| Bennettswood | Liberal | Ian Pirie | **Geoff Coleman** (Lib) | Denis Quinlan | |
| Bentleigh | Liberal | Cartha Maloney | **Inga Peulich** (Lib) | John Cordon | |
| Berwick | Liberal | Jean Lyon | **Robert Dean** (Lib) | | David Gleeson (CTA) |
| Box Hill | Liberal | Rod Beecham | **Robert Clark** (Lib) | Graeme Browne | |
| Brighton | Liberal | Mario Lucas | **Alan Stockdale** (Lib) | Jacinta Lynch | |
| Broadmeadows | Labor | **John Brumby** | Anthony Fernandez (Lib) | | Sue Phillips (Ind) |
| Bulleen | Liberal | Peter De Angelis | **David Perrin** (Lib) | Susan Brown | |
| Bundoora | Labor | **Sherryl Garbutt** | Mark Webster (Lib) | Robert Brown | |
| Burwood | Liberal | Helen Matthews | **Jeff Kennett** (Lib) | Neil Phillips | |
| Carrum | Labor | **Mal Sandon** | David Lean (Lib) | Bev Brain | Keith Edwards (Ind) |
| Caulfield | Liberal | Tony Williams | Helen Shardey (Lib) | Suzi Arnold | |
| Clayton | Labor | Hong Lim | Norman Kennedy (Lib) | Raymond Schlager | Eileen Blake-Lazarus (Ind) |
| Coburg | Labor | **Carlo Carli** | Dino De Marchi (Lib) | Martin Richardson | |
| Cranbourne | Liberal | Dale Wilson | **Gary Rowe** (Lib) | | |
| Dandenong | Labor | **John Pandazopoulos** | Colin Madden (Lib) | Mary Anne Kruzycki | Ken Cook (CTA); Liz Mantell (Ind) |
| Dandenong North | Labor | **Jan Wilson** | John Kelly (Lib) | David McLennan | Ian Wills (CTA) |
| Doncaster | Liberal | Kevin Jensen | **Victor Perton** (Lib) | George Rose | |
| Dromana | Liberal | Ian Pugh | Martin Dixon (Lib) | Jan Charlwood | Neale Adams (Ind); Paul McGuinness (Ind) |
| Eltham | Liberal | Sigmund Jorgensen | **Wayne Phillips** (Lib) | Peter Jackson | Gavin Gray (Ind) |
| Essendon | Liberal | Judy Maddigan | **Ian Davis** (Lib) | Jamie Pollock | Joan Brodie (Ind); Simone Green (Ind); Geoff Lutz (Ind) |
| Evelyn | Liberal | Di Moore | **Jim Plowman** (Lib) | Frank Youakim | Bruce Aumann (Ind) |
| Footscray | Labor | **Bruce Mildenhall** | David Sisson (Lib) | James Ryan | |
| Forest Hill | Liberal | David Finnerty | **John Richardson** (Lib) | Deborah Shay | |
| Frankston | Liberal | Wayne Woods | Andrea McCall (Lib) | Laurens Smits | |
| Frankston East | Liberal | Colin Hampton | **Peter McLellan** (Lib) | Myrna Vanderloo | Marianne Meehan (Ind) |
| Geelong | Liberal | Philip Wight | **Ann Henderson** (Lib) | Robert Nieuwenhuis | |
| Geelong North | Labor | **Peter Loney** | Tony Ansett (Lib) | | |
| Gippsland East | National | Lynne Roder | **David Treasure** (Nat) | Bruce Lusher | Bruce Ellett (Ind) |
| Gippsland South | National | Jim Walton | **Peter Ryan** (Nat) | Colin Barnes | |
| Gippsland West | Liberal | Susan Davies | **Alan Brown** (Lib) | | Mike Lowry (Ind) |
| Gisborne | Liberal | Mark Ridgeway | **Tom Reynolds** (Lib) | Mark Brady | Frank Colosimo (CTA) |
| Glen Waverley | Liberal | Pam Pritchard | **Ross Smith** (Lib) | Michael Soos | |
| Hawthorn | Liberal | Ian Cleaver-Wilkinson | **Phil Gude** (Lib) | Lorna Scurfield | Jenny Henty (Ind) |
| Ivanhoe | Liberal | Craig Langdon | **Vin Heffernan** (Lib) | Stephen Griffith | |
| Keilor | Labor | **George Seitz** | Nicholas Kosenko (Lib) | | Abe Chahrouk (Ind) |
| Kew | Liberal | Bill Elms | **Jan Wade** (Lib) | Gabrielle Dewan | |
| Knox | Liberal | Christopher Smith | **Hurtle Lupton** (Lib) | Leah Mandylas | |
| Malvern | Liberal | Gabriel Hermes | **Robert Doyle** (Lib) | Robert Johnson | |
| Melbourne | Labor | **Neil Cole** | Chin Tan (Lib) | Amara Clarke | Trevor Huggard (Ind); Di Quin (Ind); Gurm Sekhon (Ind) |
| Melton | Labor | **David Cunningham** | Margaret Wood (Lib) | | |
| Mildura | Liberal | Robyn Paull | **Craig Bildstien** (Lib) | Andrew Lawson Kerr | Russell Savage (Ind) |
| Mill Park | Labor | **Alex Andrianopoulos** | Jock Burns (Lib) | Paul D'Angelo | Jordan Gruev (Ind); Roy Mason (Ind) |
| Mitcham | Liberal | Julie Warren | **Roger Pescott** (Lib) | Andrew Stenberg | Howard Tankey (Ind) |
| Monbulk | Liberal | Philip Staindl | **Steve McArthur** (Lib) | Jennifer Brain | Louis Delacretaz (Ind); Terry Lonergan (Ind) |
| Mooroolbark | Liberal | Dale Burnham | **Lorraine Elliott** (Lib) | Robert Kendi | |
| Mordialloc | Liberal | Robyn McLeod | **Geoff Leigh** (Lib) | | Frank Denvir (Ind) |
| Mornington | Liberal | Dean Fletcher | **Robin Cooper** (Lib) | Suzanne Edwards | |
| Morwell | Labor | **Keith Hamilton** | Helen Hoppner (Nat) | Michael Pollock | |
| Murray Valley | National | Michelle MacDonald | **Ken Jasper** (Nat) | Patricia Jackson | |
| Narracan | Liberal | Brendan Jenkins | Florian Andrighetto (Lib) | Lisa Barnes | Luke Van Der Meulen (Ind); Peter Wells (Ind) |
| Niddrie | Labor | **Rob Hulls** | Stan Mihaloglou (Lib) | | |
| Northcote | Labor | **Tony Sheehan** | Alex Hay (Lib) | Michael Dickins | Greg Barber (Ind); Jonathan Hogge (Ind) |
| Oakleigh | Liberal | Ann Barker | **Denise McGill** (Lib) | David Hamilton | Peter Apostolou (Ind); Cameron Nicholls (Ind) |
| Pakenham | Liberal | John Anderson | **Rob Maclellan** (Lib) | Jac Grangien | Frank Dean (Ind); Carl Huybers (CTA) |
| Pascoe Vale | Labor | Christine Campbell | Ross Lazzaro (Lib) | Gerard Sanders | |
| Polwarth | Liberal | Fran Lehmann | **Ian Smith** (Lib) | Leah Rust | Brian Crook (Ind) |
| Portland | Liberal | Bill Sharrock | **Denis Napthine** (Lib) | Marguerite White | Bernard Wallace (Ind) |
| Prahran | Liberal | Nicky Kepert | Leonie Burke (Lib) | Jan Allison | |
| Preston | Labor | **Michael Leighton** | Ruth Padgett (Lib) | Richard Barnes | |
| Richmond | Labor | **Demetri Dollis** | Sunny Duong (Lib) | Larry Clarke | Dave Mizon (Ind) |
| Ripon | Liberal | Hilary Hunt | **Steve Elder** (Lib) | Martin Magee | Kingston Eldridge (CTA) |
| Rodney | National | Jason Price | **Noel Maughan** (Nat) | | Lynett Griffiths (Ind) |
| Sandringham | Liberal | Pauline Taylor | **Murray Thompson** (Lib) | Christine Savage | |
| Seymour | Liberal | Ben Hardman | **Marie Tehan** (Lib) | Frances Clarke | |
| Shepparton | National | John Sheen | **Don Kilgour** (Nat) | | Bruce Little (Ind) |
| South Barwon | Liberal | Michael Bjork-Billings | **Alister Paterson** (Lib) | Mark Toomey | |
| Springvale | Labor | **Eddie Micallef** | Miriam Hillenga (Lib) | | Andrew Hooper-Nguyen (Ind) |
| Sunshine | Labor | **Ian Baker** | Mark Forytarz (Lib) | Paul Treacy | |
| Swan Hill | National | Vera Alcock | **Barry Steggall** (Nat) | Chris Hadzilias | Tom Bowles (Ind) |
| Thomastown | Labor | **Peter Batchelor** | Anthony Bradstreet (Lib) | Lester O'Donnell | |
| Tullamarine | Liberal | David White | **Bernie Finn** (Lib) | Theo Andriopoulos | Dot White (Ind) |
| Wantirna | Liberal | Peter Bertolus | **Kim Wells** (Lib) | Terrie Caven | |
| Warrandyte | Liberal | Jenny Stray | **Phil Honeywood** (Lib) | Juliana Kendi | Louise Joy (Ind) |
| Warrnambool | National | Peter Steele | **John McGrath** (Nat) | Lee Kenos | Maggie Lindop (Ind) |
| Werribee | Labor | Mary Douglas | Trish Vejby (Lib) | | Dennis McIntosh (Ind) |
| Williamstown | Labor | **Steve Bracks** | Jeff Bird (Lib) | Yasmin Horsham | |
| Wimmera | National | Les Power | **Bill McGrath** (Nat) | Nick Kenos | Gary Cross (Ind) |
| Yan Yean | Labor | **Andre Haermeyer** | Barb Jones (Lib) | David Snowman | |

== Legislative Council ==
Sitting members are shown in bold text. Successful candidates are highlighted in the relevant colour. Where there is possible confusion, an asterisk (*) is also used.

| Province | Held by | Labor candidates | Coalition candidates | Democrats candidates | DLP candidates | Other candidates |
|---|---|---|---|---|---|---|
| Ballarat | Liberal | Catherine Laffey | **Rob Knowles** (Lib) | Myrna Rance | Brian Lugar | David Cocking (CTA) |
| Central Highlands | Liberal | Geoff Cooper | **Geoff Craige** (Lib) | Ray Doensen | Christian Schalken | |
| Chelsea | Labor | **Burwyn Davidson** | Cameron Boardman (Lib) | Kaylyn Raynor | Mechelina Schalken | Lee Fergusson (NLP) |
| Doutta Galla | Labor | **Monica Gould** | Jody Allatt (Lib) | John Davey | Gloria Brook | |
| Doutta Galla | Labor | Tayfun Eren | R McClymont (Lib) | | | S Bingle (Ind) |
| East Yarra | Liberal | Morley Muralitharan | David Davis (Lib) | Pierre Harcourt | John Murphy | Lesley Mendelson (NLP) |
| Eumemmerring | Labor | **Bob Ives** | Neil Lucas (Lib) | John Hastie | Teresa Crea | Lynne Dickson (CTA) |
| Geelong | Labor | Carole Marple | Ian Cover (Lib) | Gerald Desmarais | Bill Verhoef | |
| Gippsland | National | Christian Zahra | **Peter Hall** (Nat) | Greg Kerr | Michael Rowe | Ben Buckley (Ind) |
| Higinbotham | Liberal | Ken Wilson | John Ross (Lib) | Diane Barry | Gail King | |
| Jika Jika | Labor | **Theo Theophanous** | George Prillwitz (Lib) | Yanko Kalincev | Bill Jansen | Byron Rigby (NLP) |
| Koonung | Liberal | Chrys Abraham | **Gerald Ashman** (Lib) | Damian Wise | Paul Cahill | Jill Bannan (Ind) |
| Melbourne | Labor | **Barry Pullen** | Stuart McCraith (Lib) | Robert Stone | John Mulholland | Ngaire Mason (NLP) |
| Melbourne North | Labor | **Caroline Hogg** | Julie Beattie (Lib) | Morris Moretta | Hank Ferwerda | Joseph Kaliniy (FMA) |
| Melbourne West | Labor | Sang Nguyen | Chris MacGregor (Lib) | Alan Parker | Kevin Carroll | Joe Santana (Ind); Panayiota Stamatopoulou (NLP); Les Twentyman (Ind) |
| Monash | Liberal | Nicholas Gold | Peter Katsambanis (Lib) | Julie Peters | Terry O'Hanlon | Joan Dickins (NLP); Jonathan Heath (Ind) |
| North Eastern | National | Rachelle Valente | Glen Nichols (Lib); Jeanette Powell* (Nat) | John Clarke | Gavan Grimes | |
| North Western | National | Gary Thorn | **Ron Best** (Nat) | Don Semmens | Peter Ferwerda | Gary Schorel (Ind) |
| Silvan | Liberal | Kathy Jackson | Wendy Smith (Lib) | John McLaren | Alan Jansen | Sue Cawthorn (Ind); Steve Raskovy (Ind) |
| South Eastern | Liberal | Jude Perera | **Ken Smith** (Lib) | Glen Maddock | Pat Crea | Bill McCluskey (Ind); Alan Shield (NLP) |
| Templestowe | Liberal | Heather Garth | Carlo Furletti (Lib) | Angela Carter | Frances Murphy | |
| Waverley | Labor | Garth Head | Maree Luckins (Lib) | Richard Grummet | Matt Cody | |
| Western | Liberal | Elizabeth Wilson | **Bruce Chamberlain** (Lib) | Don Anderson | Christine Dodd | |
