= Members of the Victorian Legislative Council, 1992–1996 =

- ←1988–1992 1996–1999→

This is a list of members of the Victorian Legislative Council between 1992 and 1996. As half of the Legislative Council's terms expired at each periodic election, half of these members were elected at the 1988 state election with terms expiring in 1996, while the other half were elected at the 1992 state election with terms intended to expire in 2000, but which lapsed at the 1999 state election.

Name	Party	Province	Term expires	Term of office
Louise Asher	Liberal democracy	Monash	1999	1992–present
Gerald Ashman	Liberal	Boronia	1996	1988–2002
Bruce Atkinson	Liberal	Koonung	1999	1992–present
Bill Baxter	National	North Eastern	1999	1978–1984; 1985–2006
Ron Best	National	Western	1996	1988–2002
Mark Birrell	Liberal	East Yarra	1999	1983–2002
Barry Bishop	National	North Western	1999	1992–2006
Ron Bowden	Liberal	South Eastern	1999	1992–2006
Andrew Brideson	Liberal	Waverley	1999	1992–2006
John Brumby^{[1]}	Labor	Doutta Galla	1996	1993
Bruce Chamberlain	Liberal	Western	1996	1976–2002
Geoffrey Connard	Liberal	Higinbotham	1996	1982–1996
George Cox	Liberal	Nunawading	1996	1988–1996
Geoff Craige	Liberal	Central Highlands	1996	1988–2002
Burwyn Davidson	Labor	Chelsea	1996	1988–1996
Philip Davis	Liberal	Gippsland	1999	1992–2014
Dick de Fegely	Liberal	Ballarat	1999	1985–1999
David Evans	National	North Eastern	1996	1976–1996
Bill Forwood	Liberal	Templestowe	1999	1992–2006
Monica Gould^{[1]}	Labor	Doutta Galla	1996	1993–2006
James Guest	Liberal	Monash	1996	1976–1996
Peter Hall	National	Gippsland	1996	1988–2014
Roger Hallam	National	Western	1999	1985–2002
Bill Hartigan	Liberal	Geelong	1999	1992–1999
David Henshaw	Labor	Geelong	1996	1982–1996
Caroline Hogg	Labor	Melbourne North	1996	1982–1999
Bob Ives	Labor	Eumemmerring	1996	1988–1996
Rob Knowles	Liberal	Ballarat	1996	1976–1999
Licia Kokocinski	Labor	Melbourne West	1996	1988–1996
Bill Landeryou^{[1]}	Labor	Doutta Galla	1996	1976–1992
Jean McLean	Labor	Melbourne West	1999	1985–1999
Brian Mier	Labor	Waverley	1996	1982–1996
Don Nardella	Labor	Melbourne North	1999	1992–1999
Pat Power	Labor	Jika Jika	1999	1992–1999
Barry Pullen	Labor	Melbourne	1996	1982–1999
Bruce Skeggs	Liberal	Templestowe	1996	1988–1996
Ken Smith	Liberal	South Eastern	1996	1988–2002
Graeme Stoney	Liberal	Central Highlands	1999	1992–2006
Haddon Storey	Liberal	East Yarra	1996	1971–1996
Chris Strong	Liberal	Higinbotham	1999	1992–2006
Theo Theophanous	Labor	Jika Jika	1996	1988–2010
Rosemary Varty	Liberal	Silvan	1999	1985–1999
Doug Walpole	Labor	Melbourne	1999	1992–1999
Dr Ron Wells	Liberal	Eumemmerring	1999	1992–1999
David White	Labor	Doutta Galla	1999	1976–1996
Sue Wilding	Liberal	Chelsea	1999	1992–1999

^{1} Bill Landeryou, Labor MLC for Doutta Galla Province, resigned in December 1992. Labor candidate John Brumby won the resulting by-election on 20 February 1993. However, in June, Brumby was elected leader of the Labor Party, forcing his resignation from the Legislative Council on 10 August 1993 in order to contest a by-election in the Legislative Assembly. Labor candidate Monica Gould won the resulting by-election on 18 September.

== Sourcesnu ==
- "Find a Member". State Government of Victoria.
