= Results of the 1996 Victorian state election (Legislative Assembly) =

Australian state election results

Victorian state election, 30 March 1996 Legislative Assembly << 1992–1999 >>
Enrolled voters	3,000,076				
Votes cast	2,822,531		Turnout	94.08	–1.05
Informal votes	64,964		Informal	2.30	–1.51
Summary of votes by party
Party	Primary votes	%	Swing	Seats	Change
Liberal	1,212,933	43.99	–0.17	49	– 3
Labor	1,189,475	43.13	+4.72	29	+ 2
National	184,419	6.69	–1.14	9	± 0
Natural Law	51,231	1.86	+0.54	0	± 0
Call to Australia	6,222	0.23	+0.19	0	± 0
Other	13,964	0.51	–0.22	0	± 0
Independent	99,426	3.61	–3.90	1	+ 1
Total	2,757,567			88	
Two-party-preferred
Liberal/National	1,472,365	53.47	–2.83		
Labor	1,281,418	46.53	+2.83		

This is a list of electoral district results for the 1996 Victorian state election.

== Results by electoral district ==
=== Albert Park ===
1996 Victorian state election: Albert Park
Party	Candidate	Votes	%	±%
Labor	John Thwaites	18,789	57.1	+10.7
Liberal	Eacham Curry	12,999	39.5	+0.1
Natural Law	Heath Allison	1,135	3.4	+1.4
Total formal votes		32,923	97.8	+2.0
Informal votes		741	2.2	−2.0
Turnout		33,664	89.8	
Two-party-preferred result
Labor	John Thwaites	19,328	58.8	+3.0
Liberal	Eacham Curry	13,554	41.2	−3.0
Labor hold		Swing	+3.0	

=== Altona ===
1996 Victorian state election: Altona
Party	Candidate	Votes	%	±%
Labor	Lynne Kosky	17,323	56.8	+3.8
Liberal	Teresa Thompson	12,045	39.5	+6.0
Natural Law	Marco Andreacchio	1,145	3.8	−1.9
Total formal votes		30,513	97.2	+1.7
Informal votes		895	2.8	−1.7
Turnout		31,408	94.5	
Two-party-preferred result
Labor	Lynne Kosky	17,739	58.2	−2.7
Liberal	Teresa Thompson	12,737	41.8	+2.7
Labor hold		Swing	−2.7	

=== Ballarat East ===
1996 Victorian state election: Ballarat East
Party	Candidate	Votes	%	±%
Liberal	Barry Traynor	14,232	48.3	−1.9
Labor	Frank Sheehan	14,110	47.9	+2.4
Independent	Ralph Manno	481	1.6	+1.6
Call to Australia	Ray Suttie	415	1.4	+1.4
Natural Law	Alan McDonald	241	0.8	+0.8
Total formal votes		29,479	98.4	+0.9
Informal votes		473	1.6	−0.9
Turnout		29,952	94.8	
Two-party-preferred result
Liberal	Barry Traynor	14,736	50.1	−1.6
Labor	Frank Sheehan	14,709	49.9	+1.6
Liberal hold		Swing	−1.6	

=== Ballarat West ===
1996 Victorian state election: Ballarat West
Party	Candidate	Votes	%	±%
Liberal	Paul Jenkins	14,706	49.5	+0.7
Labor	Robyn Mason	13,623	45.8	+3.6
Call to Australia	Jodie Rickard	871	2.9	+2.9
Natural Law	Peter Smith	530	1.8	+1.8
Total formal votes		29,730	98.2	+1.0
Informal votes		550	1.8	−1.0
Turnout		30,280	94.9	
Two-party-preferred result
Liberal	Paul Jenkins	15,265	51.4	−1.3
Labor	Robyn Mason	14,446	48.6	+1.3
Liberal hold		Swing	−1.3	

=== Bayswater ===
1996 Victorian state election: Bayswater
Party	Candidate	Votes	%	±%
Liberal	Gordon Ashley	17,843	56.0	+2.2
Labor	Barbara Lewis	13,115	41.1	+4.0
Natural Law	Maggie Lawrence	920	2.9	+2.9
Total formal votes		31,878	98.1	+1.4
Informal votes		605	1.9	−1.4
Turnout		32,483	94.3	
Two-party-preferred result
Liberal	Gordon Ashley	18,311	57.5	+0.4
Labor	Barbara Lewis	13,546	42.5	−0.4
Liberal hold		Swing	+0.4	

=== Bellarine ===
1996 Victorian state election: Bellarine
Party	Candidate	Votes	%	±%
Liberal	Garry Spry	16,974	55.5	−2.4
Labor	Elaine Carbines	13,586	44.5	+2.4
Total formal votes		30,560	98.3	+0.7
Informal votes		534	1.7	−0.7
Turnout		31,094	95.8	+1.5
Liberal hold		Swing	−2.4	

=== Benalla ===
1996 Victorian state election: Benalla
Party	Candidate	Votes	%	±%
National	Pat McNamara	18,055	58.9	−9.3
Labor	Zuvele Leschen	7,250	23.6	−3.2
Independent	Bill Hill	4,711	15.4	+15.4
Independent	Brian Lumsden	382	1.2	−3.8
Natural Law	James Charlwood	275	0.9	+0.9
Total formal votes		30,673	98.1	+0.3
Informal votes		601	1.9	−0.3
Turnout		31,274	94.9	−0.9
Two-party-preferred result
National	Pat McNamara	19,969	65.3	−5.5
Labor	Zuvele Leschen	10,628	34.7	+5.5
National hold		Swing	−5.5	

=== Benambra ===
1996 Victorian state election: Benambra
Party	Candidate	Votes	%	±%
Liberal	Tony Plowman	19,452	62.9	+18.5
Labor	Michael Deuis	12,053	33.1	+4.4
Natural Law	Roslyn Johnson	1,261	4.1	+4.1
Total formal votes		30,947	98.0	+1.1
Informal votes		627	2.0	−1.1
Turnout		31,574	93.3	−1.0
Two-party-preferred result
Liberal	Tony Plowman	20,085	64.9	+0.2
Labor	Michael Deuis	10,859	35.1	−0.2
Liberal hold		Swing	+0.2	

=== Bendigo East ===
1996 Victorian state election: Bendigo East
Party	Candidate	Votes	%	±%
Liberal	Michael John	16,035	52.3	−1.6
Labor	Julie Flynn	12,803	41.8	+4..9
Independent	Geoff Ferns	1,107	3.6	+3.6
Natural Law	Susan Griffith	712	2.3	+2.3
Total formal votes		30,657	98.7	+0.9
Informal votes		406	1.3	−0.9
Turnout		31,063	94.7	−1.6
Two-party-preferred result
Liberal	Michael John	16,842	55.0	−4.1
Labor	Julie Flynn	13,771	45.0	+4.1
Liberal hold		Swing	−4.1	

=== Bendigo West ===
1996 Victorian state election: Bendigo West
Party	Candidate	Votes	%	±%
Labor	Bob Cameron	13,849	43.7	−1.8
Liberal	Max Turner	13,632	43.0	+7.3
Independent	Willi Carney	1,936	6.1	+6.1
Independent	Karen Brown	1,153	3.6	+3.6
Shooters	Tom Comini	974	3.1	+3.1
Natural Law	Robert Freethy	152	0.5	+0.5
Total formal votes		31,696	98.5	+0.7
Informal votes		491	1.5	−0.7
Turnout		32,187	94.9	
Two-party-preferred result
Labor	Bob Cameron	16,371	51.7	+2.8
Liberal	Max Turner	15,281	48.3	−2.8
Labor gain from Liberal		Swing	+2.8	

=== Bennettswood ===
1996 Victorian state election: Bennettswood
Party	Candidate	Votes	%	±%
Liberal	Geoff Coleman	17,685	58.0	+1.3
Labor	Ian Pirie	12,053	39.6	+5.7
Natural Law	Denis Quinlan	737	2.4	−1.1
Total formal votes		30,475	98.1	+1.8
Informal votes		580	1.9	−1.8
Turnout		31,055	94.4	
Two-party-preferred result
Liberal	Geoff Coleman	18,032	59.2	−2.6
Labor	Ian Pirie	12,415	40.8	+2.6
Liberal hold		Swing	−2.6	

=== Bentleigh ===
1996 Victorian state election: Bentleigh
Party	Candidate	Votes	%	±%
Liberal	Inga Peulich	16,957	53.7	+1.1
Labor	Cartha Maloney	13,839	43.9	+7.1
Natural Law	John Cordon	759	2.4	+2.4
Total formal votes		31,555	98.0	+1.5
Informal votes		636	2.0	−1.5
Turnout		32,191	95.1	+0.1
Two-party-preferred result
Liberal	Inga Peulich	17,247	54.7	−3.5
Labor	Cartha Maloney	14,280	45.3	+3.5
Liberal hold		Swing	−3.5	

=== Berwick ===
1996 Victorian state election: Berwick
Party	Candidate	Votes	%	±%
Liberal	Robert Dean	19,105	53.2	+2.7
Labor	Jean Lyon	15,342	42.7	+5.8
Call to Australia	David Gleeson	1,487	4.1	+4.1
Total formal votes		35,934	97.5	+1.7
Informal votes		939	2.5	−1.7
Turnout		36,873	95.0	
Two-party-preferred result
Liberal	Robert Dean	19,858	55.3	−1.7
Labor	Jean Lyon	16,060	44.7	+1.7
Liberal hold		Swing	−1.7	

=== Box Hill ===
1996 Victorian state election: Box Hill
Party	Candidate	Votes	%	±%
Liberal	Robert Clark	18,270	59.1	−1.2
Labor	Rod Beecham	11,826	38.3	+5.6
Natural Law	Graeme Browne	798	2.6	+2.6
Total formal votes		30,894	98.3	+1.0
Informal votes		541	1.7	−1.0
Turnout		31,435	93.7	
Two-party-preferred result
Liberal	Robert Clark	18,623	60.3	−2.9
Labor	Rod Beecham	12,243	39.7	+2.9
Liberal hold		Swing	−2.9	

=== Brighton ===
1996 Victorian state election: Brighton
Party	Candidate	Votes	%	±%
Liberal	Alan Stockdale	20,299	66.6	−3.6
Labor	Mario Lucas	9,165	30.1	+6.5
Natural Law	Jacinta Lynch	1,009	3.3	−1.7
Total formal votes		30,473	98.2	+1.5
Informal votes		549	1.8	−1.5
Turnout		31,022	92.8	
Two-party-preferred result
Liberal	Alan Stockdale	20,738	68.1	−4.7
Labor	Mario Lucas	9,702	31.9	+4.7
Liberal hold		Swing	−4.7	

=== Broadmeadows ===
1996 Victorian state election: Broadmeadows
Party	Candidate	Votes	%	±%
Labor	John Brumby	22,249	71.7	+11.9
Liberal	Anthony Fernandez	7,271	23.4	−3.1
Independent	Sue Phillips	1,513	4.9	+4.9
Total formal votes		31,033	97.1	+2.3
Informal votes		942	2.9	−2.3
Turnout		31,975	92.7	
Two-party-preferred result
Labor	John Brumby	23,298	75.1	+5.7
Liberal	Anthony Fernandez	7,712	24.9	−5.7
Labor hold		Swing	+5.7	

=== Bulleen ===
1996 Victorian state election: Bulleen
Party	Candidate	Votes	%	±%
Liberal	David Perrin	19,331	63.4	−4.8
Labor	Peter De Angelis	10,169	33.3	+1.6
Natural Law	Susan Brown	992	3.3	+3.3
Total formal votes		30,492	97.4	+1.6
Informal votes		815	2.6	−1.6
Turnout		31,307	94.9	
Two-party-preferred result
Liberal	David Perrin	19,674	64.6	−3.6
Labor	Peter De Angelis	10,793	35.4	+3.6
Liberal hold		Swing	−3.6	

=== Bundoora ===
1996 Victorian state election: Bundoora
Party	Candidate	Votes	%	±%
Labor	Sherryl Garbutt	16,735	50.5	+3.0
Liberal	Mark Webster	15,447	46.6	+0.4
Natural Law	Robert Brown	978	2.9	−0.7
Total formal votes		33,160	98.0	+1.7
Informal votes		689	2.0	−1.7
Turnout		33,849	95.3	
Two-party-preferred result
Labor	Sherryl Garbutt	17,429	52.6	+1.5
Liberal	Mark Webster	15,718	47.4	−1.5
Labor hold		Swing	+1.5	

=== Burwood ===
1996 Victorian state election: Burwood
Party	Candidate	Votes	%	±%
Liberal	Jeff Kennett	17,836	57.2	-0.0
Labor	Helen Matthews	12,321	39.5	+6.6
Natural Law	Neil Phillips	1,001	3.2	−0.9
Total formal votes		31,158	98.3	+1.5
Informal votes		546	1.7	−1.5
Turnout		31,704	94.0	
Two-party-preferred result
Liberal	Jeff Kennett	18,234	58.6	−0.7
Labor	Helen Matthews	12,895	41.4	+0.7
Liberal hold		Swing	−0.7	

=== Carrum ===
1996 Victorian state election: Carrum
Party	Candidate	Votes	%	±%
Liberal	David Lean	16,248	49.3	+2.6
Labor	Mal Sandon	15,123	45.9	+1.3
Independent	Keith Edwards	931	2.8	+2.8
Natural Law	Bev Brain	632	1.9	−1.1
Total formal votes		32,934	98.0	+1.7
Informal votes		670	2.0	−1.7
Turnout		33,604	94.2	
Two-party-preferred result
Liberal	David Lean	16,703	50.8	+1.7
Labor	Mal Sandon	16,189	49.2	−1.7
Liberal gain from Labor		Swing	+1.7	

=== Caulfield ===
1996 Victorian state election: Caulfield
Party	Candidate	Votes	%	±%
Liberal	Helen Shardey	18,995	58.3	−5.7
Labor	Tony Williams	12,575	38.6	+2.5
Natural Law	Suzi Arnold	1,028	3.2	+3.2
Total formal votes		32,598	97.7	+1.9
Informal votes		781	2.3	−1.9
Turnout		33,379	91.6	
Two-party-preferred result
Liberal	Helen Shardey	19,306	59.3	−4.6
Labor	Tony Williams	13,264	40.7	+4.6
Liberal hold		Swing	−4.6	

=== Clayton ===
1996 Victorian state election: Clayton
Party	Candidate	Votes	%	±%
Labor	Hong Lim	17,852	55.5	+4.0
Liberal	Norman Kennedy	12,346	38.4	+0.6
Independent	Eileen Blake-Lazarus	1,501	4.7	+4.7
Natural Law	Raymond Schlager	490	1.5	+1.5
Total formal votes		32,189	96.9	+3.6
Informal votes		1,042	3.1	−3.6
Turnout		33,231	93.6	
Two-party-preferred result
Labor	Hong Lim	19,141	59.6	+1.2
Liberal	Norman Kennedy	12,979	40.4	−1.2
Labor hold		Swing	+1.2	

=== Coburg ===
1996 Victorian state election: Coburg
Party	Candidate	Votes	%	±%
Labor	Carlo Carli	19,934	65.0	+14.1
Liberal	Dino De Marchi	9,348	30.5	+1.4
Natural Law	Martin Richardson	1,405	4.6	+2.1
Total formal votes		30,687	96.9	+2.8
Informal votes		982	3.1	−2.8
Turnout		31,669	92.1	−0.2
Two-party-preferred result
Labor	Carlo Carli	20,509	66.9	+5.7
Liberal	Dino De Marchi	10,140	33.1	−5.7
Labor hold		Swing	+5.7	

=== Cranbourne ===
1996 Victorian state election: Cranbourne
Party	Candidate	Votes	%	±%
Liberal	Gary Rowe	20,912	59.1	+4.4
Labor	Dale Wilson	14,501	40.9	−4.4
Total formal votes		35,413	97.3	+1.2
Informal votes		990	2.7	−1.2
Turnout		36,403	95.6	
Liberal hold		Swing	+4.4	

=== Dandenong ===
1996 Victorian state election: Dandenong
Party	Candidate	Votes	%	±%
Labor	John Pandazopoulos	17,908	49.6	+4.0
Liberal	Colin Madden	15,912	44.1	+2.8
Independent	Liz Mantell	1,115	3.1	+3.1
Call to Australia	Ken Cook	786	2.2	+2.2
Natural Law	Mary Anne Kruzycki	389	1.1	+1.1
Total formal votes		36,110	96.4	+3.0
Informal votes		1,338	3.6	−3.0
Turnout		37,448	94.3	
Two-party-preferred result
Labor	John Pandazopoulos	19,226	53.3	+0.2
Liberal	Colin Madden	16,837	46.7	−0.2
Labor hold		Swing	+0.2	

=== Dandenong North ===
1996 Victorian state election: Dandenong North
Party	Candidate	Votes	%	±%
Labor	Jan Wilson	15,385	50.6	+0.6
Liberal	John Kelly	13,982	46.0	−3.9
Call to Australia	Ian Wills	600	2.0	+2.0
Natural Law	David McLennan	431	1.4	+1.4
Total formal votes		30,398	97.0	+2.4
Informal votes		949	3.0	−2.4
Turnout		31,347	94.3	−1.0
Two-party-preferred result
Labor	Jan Wilson	15,868	52.2	+2.1
Liberal	John Kelly	14,507	47.8	−2.1
Labor hold		Swing	+2.1	

=== Doncaster ===
1996 Victorian state election: Doncaster
Party	Candidate	Votes	%	±%
Liberal	Victor Perton	20,472	63.9	−4.1
Labor	Kevin Jensen	10,547	32.9	+1.0
Natural Law	George Rose	1,003	3.1	+3.1
Total formal votes		32,022	97.6	+1.5
Informal votes		795	2.4	−1.5
Turnout		32,817	94.6	
Two-party-preferred result
Liberal	Victor Perton	20,783	65.0	−3.1
Labor	Kevin Jensen	11,215	35.0	+3.1
Liberal hold		Swing	−3.1	

=== Dromana ===
1996 Victorian state election: Dromana
Party	Candidate	Votes	%	±%
Liberal	Martin Dixon	16,032	51.0	−7.2
Labor	Ian Pugh	10,739	34.1	+0.1
Independent	Paul McGuinness	3,582	11.4	+11.4
Independent	Neale Adams	808	2.6	+2.6
Natural Law	Jan Charlwood	286	0.9	−0.9
Total formal votes		31,447	98.4	+1.4
Informal votes		510	1.6	−1.4
Turnout		31,957	94.2	−1.0
Two-party-preferred result
Liberal	Martin Dixon	18,229	58.1	−3.9
Labor	Ian Pugh	13,165	41.9	+3.9
Liberal hold		Swing	−3.9	

=== Eltham ===
1996 Victorian state election: Eltham
Party	Candidate	Votes	%	±%
Liberal	Wayne Phillips	19,624	54.7	−2.3
Labor	Sigmund Jorgensen	13,744	38.3	+3.4
Independent	Gavin Gray	2,136	6.0	+6.0
Natural Law	Peter Jackson	389	1.1	−2.5
Total formal votes		35,893	98.6	+1.3
Informal votes		522	1.4	−1.3
Turnout		36,415	95.4	
Two-party-preferred result
Liberal	Wayne Phillips	20,328	56.8	−3.2
Labor	Sigmund Jorgensen	15,467	43.2	+3.2
Liberal hold		Swing	−3.2	

=== Essendon ===
1996 Victorian state election: Essendon
Party	Candidate	Votes	%	±%
Labor	Judy Maddigan	15,652	50.9	+6.9
Liberal	Ian Davis	13,282	43.2	+0.2
Independent	Joan Brodie	978	3.2	+3.2
Independent	Geoff Lutz	291	0.9	+0.9
Independent	Simone Green	288	0.9	+0.9
Natural Law	Jamie Pollock	263	0.9	−1.3
Total formal votes		30,754	97.7	+1.4
Informal votes		727	2.3	−1.4
Turnout		31,481	93.3	
Two-party-preferred result
Labor	Judy Maddigan	16,404	53.4	+4.6
Liberal	Ian Davis	14,324	46.6	−4.6
Labor gain from Liberal		Swing	+4.6	

=== Evelyn ===
1996 Victorian state election: Evelyn
Party	Candidate	Votes	%	±%
Liberal	Jim Plowman	19,044	59.9	+1.6
Labor	Di Moore	10,638	33.4	+3.4
Independent	Bruce Aumann	1,702	5.4	+5.4
Natural Law	Frank Youakim	425	1.3	+1.3
Total formal votes		31,809	97.5	+0.8
Informal votes		802	2.5	−0.8
Turnout		32,611	94.1	
Two-party-preferred result
Liberal	Jim Plowman	19,914	62.7	−2.5
Labor	Di Moore	11,842	37.3	+2.5
Liberal hold		Swing	−2.5	

=== Footscray ===
1996 Victorian state election: Footscray
Party	Candidate	Votes	%	±%
Labor	Bruce Mildenhall	19,770	68.0	+10.2
Liberal	David Sisson	8,661	29.8	+3.0
Natural Law	James Ryan	625	2.2	+2.2
Total formal votes		29,056	95.8	+3.1
Informal votes		1,261	4.2	−3.1
Turnout		30,317	91.1	
Two-party-preferred result
Labor	Bruce Mildenhall	20,142	69.4	+3.2
Liberal	David Sisson	8,897	30.6	−3.2
Labor hold		Swing	+3.2	

=== Forest Hill ===
1996 Victorian state election: Forest Hill
Party	Candidate	Votes	%	±%
Liberal	John Richardson	18,637	59.6	−5.7
Labor	David Finnerty	11,766	37.6	+3.0
Natural Law	Deborah Shay	853	2.7	+2.7
Total formal votes		31,256	98.1	+2.1
Informal votes		608	1.9	−2.1
Turnout		31,864	94.8	
Two-party-preferred result
Liberal	John Richardson	18,793	60.5	−4.8
Labor	David Finnerty	12,271	39.5	+4.8
Liberal hold		Swing	−4.8	

=== Frankston ===
1996 Victorian state election: Frankston
Party	Candidate	Votes	%	±%
Liberal	Andrea McCall	19,180	64.3	+1.1
Labor	Wayne Woods	10,021	33.6	+5.5
Natural Law	Laurens Smits	626	2.1	−2.1
Total formal votes		29,827	98.3	+1.1
Informal votes		520	1.7	−1.1
Turnout		30,347	93.6	
Two-party-preferred result
Liberal	Andrea McCall	19,508	65.4	−2.1
Labor	Wayne Woods	10,300	34.6	+2.1
Liberal hold		Swing	−2.1	

=== Frankston East ===
1996 Victorian state election: Frankston East
Party	Candidate	Votes	%	±%
Liberal	Peter McLellan	13,085	48.9	+2.3
Labor	Colin Hampton	11,852	44.3	+0.7
Independent	Marianne Meehan	1,511	5.6	+5.6
Natural Law	Myrna Vanderloo	300	1.1	+1.1
Total formal votes		26,748	97.8	+2.1
Informal votes		590	2.2	−2.1
Turnout		27,338	94.3	−1.9
Two-party-preferred result
Liberal	Peter McLellan	14,192	53.1	+2.9
Labor	Colin Hampton	12,529	46.9	−2.9
Liberal hold		Swing	+2.9	

=== Geelong ===
1996 Victorian state election: Geelong
Party	Candidate	Votes	%	±%
Liberal	Ann Henderson	16,543	52.6	+6.8
Labor	Philip Wight	14,171	45.1	+4.2
Natural Law	Robert Nieuwenhuis	731	2.3	+2.3
Total formal votes		31,445	97.8	+0.6
Informal votes		705	2.2	−0.6
Turnout		32,150	94.3	−0.6
Two-party-preferred result
Liberal	Ann Henderson	16,818	53.5	+2.8
Labor	Philip Wight	14,615	46.5	−2.8
Liberal hold		Swing	+2.8	

=== Geelong North ===
1996 Victorian state election: Geelong North
Party	Candidate	Votes	%	±%
Labor	Peter Loney	18,042	58.1	+5.9
Liberal	Tony Ansett	13,026	41.9	+5.4
Total formal votes		31,068	97.0	+1.9
Informal votes		961	3.0	−1.9
Turnout		32,029	95.4	−0.4
Labor hold		Swing	−1.5	

=== Gippsland East ===
1996 Victorian state election: Gippsland East
Party	Candidate	Votes	%	±%
National	David Treasure	15,999	52.9	−3.6
Labor	Lynne Roder	8,636	28.5	+8.1
Independent	Bruce Ellett	5,226	17.3	+6.5
Natural Law	Bruce Lusher	408	1.3	+1.3
Total formal votes		30,269	98.3	+0.5
Informal votes		530	1.7	−0.5
Turnout		30,799	94.1	
Two-party-preferred result
National	David Treasure	19,672	65.2	−8.2
Labor	Lynne Roder	10,494	34.8	+8.2
National hold		Swing	−8.2	

=== Gippsland South ===
1996 Victorian state election: Gippsland South
Party	Candidate	Votes	%	±%
National	Peter Ryan	20,747	67.7	+2.4
Labor	Jim Walton	8,739	28.5	+5.4
Natural Law	Colin Barnes	1,151	3.8	+3.8
Total formal votes		30,637	98.3	+0.5
Informal votes		538	1.7	−0.5
Turnout		31,175	94.6	
Two-party-preferred result
National	Peter Ryan	21,258	69.4	−4.5
Labor	Jim Walton	9,353	30.6	+4.5
National hold		Swing	−4.5	

=== Gippsland West ===
1996 Victorian state election: Gippsland West
Party	Candidate	Votes	%	±%
Liberal	Alan Brown	16,944	57.7	−7.5
Labor	Susan Davies	9,755	33.2	+3.7
Independent	Mike Lowry	2,646	9.0	+9.0
Total formal votes		29,345	98.3	+0.9
Informal votes		513	1.7	−0.9
Turnout		29,858	95.2	
Two-party-preferred result
Liberal	Alan Brown	18,356	62.6	−5.3
Labor	Susan Davies	10,956	37.4	+5.3
Liberal hold		Swing	−5.3	

=== Gisborne ===
1996 Victorian state election: Gisborne
Party	Candidate	Votes	%	±%
Liberal	Tom Reynolds	17,630	55.7	−7.2
Labor	Mark Ridgeway	12,918	40.8	+3.7
Call to Australia	Frank Colosimo	667	2.1	+2.1
Natural Law	Mark Brady	457	1.4	+1.4
Total formal votes		31,672	98.0	+0.9
Informal votes		631	2.0	−0.9
Turnout		32,303	95.6	
Two-party-preferred result
Liberal	Tom Reynolds	18,293	57.8	−5.1
Labor	Mark Ridgeway	13,337	42.2	+5.1
Liberal hold		Swing	−5.1	

=== Glen Waverley ===
1996 Victorian state election: Glen Waverley
Party	Candidate	Votes	%	±%
Liberal	Ross Smith	19,212	64.8	−2.2
Labor	Pam Pritchard	9,738	32.8	+5.5
Natural Law	Michael Soos	705	2.4	+2.4
Total formal votes		29,655	98.2	+1.4
Informal votes		556	1.8	−1.4
Turnout		30,211	94.8	−1.0
Two-party-preferred result
Liberal	Ross Smith	19,457	65.7	−3.8
Labor	Pam Pritchard	10,172	34.3	+3.8
Liberal hold		Swing	−3.8	

=== Hawthorn ===
1996 Victorian state election: Hawthorn
Party	Candidate	Votes	%	±%
Liberal	Phil Gude	20,251	60.9	−4.1
Labor	Ian Cleaver-Wilkinson	9,662	29.1	+3.5
Independent	Jenny Henty	2,744	8.3	+8.3
Natural Law	Lorna Scurfield	592	1.8	−7.6
Total formal votes		33,249	98.8	+1.7
Informal votes		406	1.2	−1.7
Turnout		33,655	94.4	
Two-party-preferred result
Liberal	Phil Gude	21,068	63.6	−4.8
Labor	Ian Cleaver-Wilkinson	12,077	36.4	+4.8
Liberal hold		Swing	−4.8	

=== Ivanhoe ===
1996 Victorian state election: Ivanhoe
Party	Candidate	Votes	%	±%
Labor	Craig Langdon	14,965	49.3	+8.7
Liberal	Vin Heffernan	14,399	47.5	−3.4
Natural Law	Stephen Griffith	969	3.2	−1.2
Total formal votes		30,333	97.9	+1.5
Informal votes		648	2.1	−1.5
Turnout		30,981	94.2	
Two-party-preferred result
Labor	Craig Langdon	15,623	51.6	+5.9
Liberal	Vin Heffernan	14,667	48.4	−5.9
Labor gain from Liberal		Swing	+5.9	

=== Keilor ===
1996 Victorian state election: Keilor
Party	Candidate	Votes	%	±%
Labor	George Seitz	20,290	58.9	+6.2
Liberal	Nicholas Kosenko	12,833	37.3	+0.3
Independent	Abe Chahrouk	1,302	3.8	+3.8
Total formal votes		34,425	95.8	+1.4
Informal votes		1,512	4.2	−1.4
Turnout		35,937	94.2	
Two-party-preferred result
Labor	George Seitz	21,186	61.6	+2.7
Liberal	Nicholas Kosenko	13,226	38.4	−2.7
Labor hold		Swing	+2.7	

=== Kew ===
1996 Victorian state election: Kew
Party	Candidate	Votes	%	±%
Liberal	Jan Wade	19,946	63.7	−4.2
Labor	Bill Elms	10,275	32.8	+9.2
Natural Law	Gabrielle Dewan	1,101	3.5	+3.5
Total formal votes		31,322	98.2	+1.2
Informal votes		587	1.8	−1.2
Turnout		31,909	93.2	
Two-party-preferred result
Liberal	Jan Wade	20,339	65.0	−6.5
Labor	Bill Elms	10,949	35.0	+6.5
Liberal hold		Swing	−6.5	

=== Knox ===
1996 Victorian state election: Knox
Party	Candidate	Votes	%	±%
Liberal	Hurtle Lupton	18,916	56.9	+6.7
Labor	Christopher Smith	13,376	40.2	+3.8
Natural Law	Leah Mandylas	951	2.9	+2.9
Total formal votes		33,243	98.0	+0.9
Informal votes		689	2.0	−0.9
Turnout		33,932	94.9	−1.0
Two-party-preferred result
Liberal	Hurtle Lupton	19,234	57.9	+1.8
Labor	Christopher Smith	13,981	42.1	−1.8
Liberal hold		Swing	+1.8	

=== Malvern ===
1996 Victorian state election: Malvern
Party	Candidate	Votes	%	±%
Liberal	Robert Doyle	20,990	66.4	−2.3
Labor	Gabriel Hermes	9,667	30.6	+6.6
Natural Law	Robert Johnson	933	3.0	−4.4
Total formal votes		31,590	98.2	+1.0
Informal votes		581	1.8	−1.0
Turnout		32,171	92.3	
Two-party-preferred result
Liberal	Robert Doyle	21,349	67.6	−4.9
Labor	Gabriel Hermes	10,215	32.4	+4.9
Liberal hold		Swing	−4.9	

=== Melbourne ===
1996 Victorian state election: Melbourne
Party	Candidate	Votes	%	±%
Labor	Neil Cole	17,276	53.6	+2.1
Liberal	Chin Tan	9,907	30.8	−2.1
Independent	Gurm Sekhon	1,965	6.1	+6.1
Independent	Trevor Huggard	1,930	6.0	+6.0
Independent	Di Quin	808	2.5	+2.5
Natural Law	Amara Clarke	320	1.0	−0.8
Total formal votes		32,206	97.0	+3.0
Informal votes		1,006	3.0	−3.0
Turnout		33,212	88.4	
Two-party-preferred result
Labor	Neil Cole	21,145	65.9	+3.8
Liberal	Chin Tan	10,935	34.1	−3.8
Labor hold		Swing	+3.8	

=== Melton ===
1996 Victorian state election: Melton
Party	Candidate	Votes	%	±%
Labor	David Cunningham	21,238	62.2	+9.1
Liberal	Margaret Wood	12,928	37.8	+2.3
Total formal votes		34,166	96.7	+1.5
Informal votes		1,178	3.3	−1.5
Turnout		35,344	93.6	
Labor hold		Swing	+2.2	

=== Mildura ===
1996 Victorian state election: Mildura
Party	Candidate	Votes	%	±%
Liberal	Craig Bildstien	13,443	45.2	−20.8
Independent	Russell Savage	10,616	35.7	+35.7
Labor	Robyn Paull	5,338	17.9	−6.6
Natural Law	Andrew Lawson Kerr	364	1.2	+1.2
Total formal votes		29,761	98.3	+0.7
Informal votes		521	1.7	−0.7
Turnout		30,282	94.1	
Two-party-preferred result
Liberal	Craig Bildstien	19,211	64.7	−6.2
Labor	Robyn Paull	10,495	35.3	+6.2
Two-candidate-preferred result
Independent	Russell Savage	15,273	51.4	+51.4
Liberal	Craig Bildstien	14,447	48.6	−22.3
Independent gain from Liberal		Swing	+51.4	

=== Mill Park ===
1996 Victorian state election: Mill Park
Party	Candidate	Votes	%	±%
Labor	Alex Andrianopoulos	20,224	60.1	+10.1
Liberal	Jock Burns	10,769	32.0	+3.9
Independent	Jordan Gruev	1,812	5.4	+5.4
Natural Law	Paul D'Angelo	513	1.5	+1.5
Independent	Roy Mason	346	1.0	+1.0
Total formal votes		33,664	96.4	+1.5
Informal votes		1,244	3.6	−1.5
Turnout		34,908	95.0	
Two-party-preferred result
Labor	Alex Andrianopoulos	21,505	63.9	+1.6
Liberal	Jock Burns	12,125	36.1	−1.6
Labor hold		Swing	+1.6	

=== Mitcham ===
1996 Victorian state election: Mitcham
Party	Candidate	Votes	%	±%
Liberal	Roger Pescott	16,951	53.6	−0.8
Labor	Julie Warren	12,791	50.5	+3.1
Independent	Howard Tankey	1,539	4.9	+4.9
Natural Law	Andrew Stenberg	333	1.1	+1.1
Total formal votes		31,614	98.1	+1.1
Informal votes		620	1.9	−1.1
Turnout		32,234	95.2	
Two-party-preferred result
Liberal	Roger Pescott	17,446	55.3	−3.2
Labor	Julie Warren	14,088	44.7	+3.2
Liberal hold		Swing	−3.2	

=== Monbulk ===
1996 Victorian state election: Monbulk
Party	Candidate	Votes	%	±%
Liberal	Steve McArthur	15,684	52.5	+1.7
Labor	Philip Staindl	11,390	38.2	+2.0
Independent	Louis Delacretaz	2,024	6.8	+6.8
Natural Law	Jennifer Brain	390	1.3	−0.6
Independent	Terry Lonergan	358	1.2	+1.2
Total formal votes		29,846	98.1	+1.1
Informal votes		586	1.9	−1.1
Turnout		30,432	94.5	
Two-party-preferred result
Liberal	Steve McArthur	16,442	55.2	−0.1
Labor	Philip Staindl	13,325	44.8	+0.1
Liberal hold		Swing	−0.1	

=== Mooroolbark ===
1996 Victorian state election: Mooroolbark
Party	Candidate	Votes	%	±%
Liberal	Lorraine Elliott	18,476	60.9	+5.6
Labor	Dale Burnham	11,074	36.5	+2.6
Natural Law	Robert Kendi	805	2.7	−0.8
Total formal votes		30,355	97.9	+1.2
Informal votes		657	2.1	−1.2
Turnout		31,012	94.9	
Two-party-preferred result
Liberal	Lorraine Elliott	18,879	62.2	+2.1
Labor	Dale Burnham	11,456	37.8	−2.1
Liberal hold		Swing	+2.1	

=== Mordialloc ===
1996 Victorian state election: Mordialloc
Party	Candidate	Votes	%	±%
Liberal	Geoff Leigh	15,951	53.4	−0.9
Labor	Robyn McLeod	12,552	42.0	+3.2
Independent	Frank Denvir	1,377	4.6	+4.6
Total formal votes		29,880	98.1	+1.7
Informal votes		590	1.9	−1.7
Turnout		30,470	94.5	
Two-party-preferred result
Liberal	Geoff Leigh	16,326	54.7	−2.6
Labor	Robyn McLeod	13,524	45.3	+2.6
Liberal hold		Swing	−2.6	

=== Mornington ===
1996 Victorian state election: Mornington
Party	Candidate	Votes	%	±%
Liberal	Robin Cooper	18,291	59.2	−0.6
Labor	Dean Fletcher	11,467	37.1	+4.1
Natural Law	Suzanne Edwards	1,125	3.6	−3.5
Total formal votes		30,883	98.1	+1.3
Informal votes		610	1.9	−1.3
Turnout		31,493	93.9	
Two-party-preferred result
Liberal	Robin Cooper	18,908	61.3	−1.6
Labor	Dean Fletcher	11,954	38.7	+1.6
Liberal hold		Swing	−1.6	

=== Morwell ===
1996 Victorian state election: Morwell
Party	Candidate	Votes	%	±%
Labor	Keith Hamilton	16,080	51.5	+8.4
National	Helen Hoppner	14,094	45.1	+28.7
Natural Law	Michael Pollock	1,053	3.4	+2.8
Total formal votes		31,227	97.9	+0.6
Informal votes		673	2.1	−0.6
Turnout		31,900	95.1	
Two-party-preferred result
Labor	Keith Hamilton	16,452	52.7	−1.3
National	Helen Hoppner	14,746	47.3	+1.3
Labor hold		Swing	−1.3	

=== Murray Valley ===
1996 Victorian state election: Murray Valley
Party	Candidate	Votes	%	±%
National	Ken Jasper	22,774	71.2	−2.8
Labor	Michelle MacDonald	8,230	25.7	−0.3
Natural Law	Patricia Jackson	974	3.0	+3.0
Total formal votes		31,978	98.4	+0.9
Informal votes		530	1.6	−0.9
Turnout		32,508	94.4	
Two-party-preferred result
National	Ken Jasper	23,154	72.4	−1.6
Labor	Michelle MacDonald	8,809	27.6	+1.6
National hold		Swing	−1.6	

=== Narracan ===
1996 Victorian state election: Narracan
Party	Candidate	Votes	%	±%
Liberal	Florian Andrighetto	13,903	47.4	−4.9
Labor	Brendan Jenkins	12,271	41.8	+1.6
Independent	Peter Wells	2,135	7.3	+7.3
Natural Law	Lisa Barnes	593	2.0	+2.0
Independent	Luke Van Der Meulen	427	1.5	+1.5
Total formal votes		29,329	98.2	+0.5
Informal votes		548	1.8	−0.5
Turnout		29,877	95.3	
Two-party-preferred result
Liberal	Florian Andrighetto	15,095	51.6	−3.8
Labor	Brendan Jenkins	14,146	48.4	+3.8
Liberal hold		Swing	−3.8	

=== Niddrie ===
1996 Victorian state election: Niddrie
Party	Candidate	Votes	%	±%
Labor	Rob Hulls	16,446	54.4	+6.9
Liberal	Stan Mihaloglou	13,804	45.6	+5.2
Total formal votes		30,250	96.9	+2.1
Informal votes		977	3.1	−2.1
Turnout		31,227	95.3	
Labor hold		Swing	+0.8	

=== Northcote ===
1996 Victorian state election: Northcote
Party	Candidate	Votes	%	±%
Labor	Tony Sheehan	18,550	59.6	+4.5
Liberal	Alex Hay	8,783	28.2	+0.4
Independent	Greg Barber	2,421	7.8	+7.8
Independent	Jonathan Hogge	823	2.6	+2.6
Natural Law	Michael Dickins	554	1.8	+0.2
Total formal votes		31,131	96.2	+3.2
Informal votes		1,238	3.8	−3.2
Turnout		32,369	92.8	
Two-party-preferred result
Labor	Tony Sheehan	21,646	69.9	+4.7
Liberal	Alex Hay	9,336	30.1	−4.7
Labor hold		Swing	+4.7	

=== Oakleigh ===
1996 Victorian state election: Oakleigh
Party	Candidate	Votes	%	±%
Liberal	Denise McGill	14,317	47.4	−5.5
Labor	Ann Barker	13,842	45.9	−1.2
Independent	Cameron Nicholls	1,140	3.8	+3.8
Independent	Peter Apostolou	567	1.9	+1.9
Natural Law	David Hamilton	312	1.0	+1.0
Total formal votes		30,178	97.5	+2.0
Informal votes		763	2.5	−2.0
Turnout		30,941	93.1	
Two-party-preferred result
Liberal	Denise McGill	15,309	50.8	−2.1
Labor	Ann Barker	14,815	49.2	+2.1
Liberal hold		Swing	−2.1	

=== Pakenham ===
1996 Victorian state election: Pakenham
Party	Candidate	Votes	%	±%
Liberal	Rob Maclellan	17,830	58.1	+0.3
Labor	John Anderson	11,097	36.2	+7.2
Call to Australia	Carl Huybers	832	2.7	+2.7
Independent	Frank Dean	514	1.7	+1.7
Natural Law	Jac Grangien	402	1.3	−1.8
Total formal votes		30,675	98.0	+0.8
Informal votes		632	2.0	−0.8
Turnout		31,307	94.8	−0.3
Two-party-preferred result
Liberal	Rob Maclellan	18,687	61.1	−3.3
Labor	John Anderson	11,888	38.9	+3.3
Liberal hold		Swing	−3.3	

=== Pascoe Vale ===
1996 Victorian state election: Pascoe Vale
Party	Candidate	Votes	%	±%
Labor	Christine Campbell	16,672	60.0	+8.3
Liberal	Ross Lazzaro	10,544	38.0	+0.5
Natural Law	Gerard Sanders	562	2.0	+2.0
Total formal votes		27,778	97.1	+1.3
Informal votes		844	2.9	−1.3
Turnout		28,622	92.8	
Two-party-preferred result
Labor	Christine Campbell	16,954	61.1	+3.1
Liberal	Ross Lazzaro	10,810	38.9	−3.1
Labor hold		Swing	+3.1	

=== Polwarth ===
1996 Victorian state election: Polwarth
Party	Candidate	Votes	%	±%
Liberal	Ian Smith	15,631	50.9	−14.9
Labor	Fran Lehmann	8,715	28.4	−5.7
Independent	Brian Crook	5,719	18.6	+18.6
Natural Law	Leah Rust	616	2.0	+2.0
Total formal votes		30,681	98.1	+1.3
Informal votes		582	1.9	−1.3
Turnout		31,263	95.4	
Two-party-preferred result
Liberal	Ian Smith	17,747	58.1	−7.7
Labor	Fran Lehmann	12,779	41.9	+7.7
Liberal hold		Swing	−7.7	

=== Portland ===
1996 Victorian state election: Portland
Party	Candidate	Votes	%	±%
Liberal	Denis Napthine	15,801	55.7	−11.4
Labor	Bill Sharrock	9,781	34.5	+1.6
Independent	Bernard Wallace	2,156	7.6	+7.6
Natural Law	Marguerite White	626	2.2	+2.2
Total formal votes		28,364	98.3	+1.0
Informal votes		476	1.7	−1.0
Turnout		28,840	95.5	
Two-party-preferred result
Liberal	Denis Napthine	17,074	60.4	−6.7
Labor	Bill Sharrock	11,177	39.6	+6.7
Liberal hold		Swing	−6.7	

=== Prahran ===
1996 Victorian state election: Prahran
Party	Candidate	Votes	%	±%
Liberal	Leonie Burke	17,135	52.8	−1.9
Labor	Nicky Kepert	14,133	43.6	+8.1
Natural Law	Jan Allison	1,157	3.6	+0.0
Total formal votes		32,425	97.7	+1.8
Informal votes		770	2.3	−1.8
Turnout		33,195	87.6	
Two-party-preferred result
Liberal	Leonie Burke	17,673	54.6	−3.2
Labor	Nicky Kepert	14,697	45.4	+3.2
Liberal hold		Swing	−3.2	

=== Preston ===
1996 Victorian state election: Preston
Party	Candidate	Votes	%	±%
Labor	Michael Leighton	18,890	63.8	+4.2
Liberal	Ruth Padgett	10,026	33.9	+1.7
Natural Law	Richard Barnes	685	2.3	+0.9
Total formal votes		29,601	95.8	+2.1
Informal votes		1,292	4.2	−2.1
Turnout		30,893	93.3	
Two-party-preferred result
Labor	Michael Leighton	19,332	65.3	−0.9
Liberal	Ruth Padgett	10,254	34.7	+0.9
Labor hold		Swing	−0.9	

=== Richmond ===
1996 Victorian state election: Richmond
Party	Candidate	Votes	%	±%
Labor	Demetri Dollis	21,216	62.2	+8.9
Liberal	Sunny Duong	10,215	29.9	+1.3
Independent	Dave Mizon	1,604	4.7	+4.7
Natural Law	Larry Clarke	1,095	3.2	+3.2
Total formal votes		34,130	97.2	+4.1
Informal votes		991	2.8	−4.1
Turnout		35,121	89.1	
Two-party-preferred result
Labor	Demetri Dollis	22,902	67.3	+4.0
Liberal	Sunny Duong	11,103	32.7	−4.0
Labor hold		Swing	+4.0	

=== Ripon ===
1996 Victorian state election: Ripon
Party	Candidate	Votes	%	±%
Liberal	Steve Elder	15,678	52.5	−1.2
Labor	Hilary Hunt	13,098	43.8	+7.2
Call to Australia	Kingston Eldridge	564	1.9	+1.9
Natural Law	Martin Magee	548	1.8	+1.8
Total formal votes		29,888	98.3	+0.5
Informal votes		522	1.7	−0.5
Turnout		30,410	95.6	
Two-party-preferred result
Liberal	Steve Elder	16,303	54.6	−2.5
Labor	Hilary Hunt	13,567	45.4	+2.5
Liberal hold		Swing	−2.5	

=== Rodney ===
1996 Victorian state election: Rodney
Party	Candidate	Votes	%	±%
National	Noel Maughan	19,464	63.6	−8.3
Labor	Jason Price	6,041	19.7	−0.9
Independent	Lynett Griffiths	5,091	16.6	+16.6
Total formal votes		30,596	98.4	+0.7
Informal votes		512	1.6	−0.7
Turnout		31,108	95.9	
Two-party-preferred result
National	Noel Maughan	23,266	76.1	+0.1
Labor	Jason Price	7,304	23.9	−0.1
National hold		Swing	+0.1	

=== Sandringham ===
1996 Victorian state election: Sandringham
Party	Candidate	Votes	%	±%
Liberal	Murray Thompson	19,483	62.7	−2.9
Labor	Pauline Taylor	10,656	34.3	+9.1
Natural Law	Christine Savage	911	2.9	−6.2
Total formal votes		31,050	98.3	+1.2
Informal votes		530	1.7	−1.2
Turnout		31,580	93.6	
Two-party-preferred result
Liberal	Murray Thompson	19,945	64.3	−5.6
Labor	Pauline Taylor	11,064	35.7	+5.6
Liberal hold		Swing	−5.6	

=== Seymour ===
1996 Victorian state election: Seymour
Party	Candidate	Votes	%	±%
Liberal	Marie Tehan	16,301	52.5	+5.2
Labor	Ben Hardman	13,655	44.0	+10.8
Natural Law	Frances Clarke	1,103	3.6	+3.6
Total formal votes		31,059	98.1	+1.2
Informal votes		606	1.9	−1.2
Turnout		31,665	95.0	
Two-party-preferred result
Liberal	Marie Tehan	16,810	54.2	−6.8
Labor	Ben Hardman	14,211	45.8	+6.8
Liberal hold		Swing	−6.8	

=== Shepparton ===
1996 Victorian state election: Shepparton
Party	Candidate	Votes	%	±%
National	Don Kilgour	20,078	66.0	−3.5
Labor	John Sheen	8,466	27.8	−2.7
Independent	Bruce Little	1,886	6.2	+6.2
Total formal votes		30,430	97.6	+0.8
Informal votes		752	2.4	−0.8
Turnout		31,182	94.2	
Two-party-preferred result
National	Don Kilgour	21,161	69.6	+0.1
Labor	John Sheen	9,254	30.4	−0.1
National hold		Swing	+0.1	

=== South Barwon ===
1996 Victorian state election: South Barwon
Party	Candidate	Votes	%	±%
Liberal	Alister Paterson	18,565	59.2	+10.8
Labor	Michael Bjork-Billings	11,937	38.1	+9.0
Natural Law	Mark Toomey	868	2.8	+2.8
Total formal votes		31,370	98.2	+0.8
Informal votes		575	1.8	−0.8
Turnout		31,945	95.3	
Two-party-preferred result
Liberal	Alister Paterson	18,881	60.2	−0.6
Labor	Michael Bjork-Billings	12,473	39.8	+0.6
Liberal hold		Swing	−0.6	

=== Springvale ===
1996 Victorian state election: Springvale
Party	Candidate	Votes	%	±%
Labor	Eddie Micallef	17,076	55.0	+3.3
Liberal	Miriam Hillenga	11,850	38.2	−1.3
Independent	Andrew Hooper-Nguyen	2,110	6.8	+6.8
Total formal votes		31,036	96.7	+2.5
Informal votes		1,054	3.3	−2.5
Turnout		32,090	94.1	
Two-party-preferred result
Labor	Eddie Micallef	17,941	57.9	−0.1
Liberal	Miriam Hillenga	13,066	42.1	+0.1
Labor hold		Swing	−0.1	

=== Sunshine ===
1996 Victorian state election: Sunshine
Party	Candidate	Votes	%	±%
Labor	Ian Baker	22,038	67.6	+9.0
Liberal	Mark Forytarz	9,665	29.7	+0.9
Natural Law	Paul Treacy	876	2.7	+2.7
Total formal votes		32,579	95.2	+3.0
Informal votes		1,637	4.8	−3.0
Turnout		34,216	92.9	
Two-party-preferred result
Labor	Ian Baker	22,499	69.1	+5.8
Liberal	Mark Forytarz	10,064	30.9	−5.8
Labor hold		Swing	+5.8	

=== Swan Hill ===
1996 Victorian state election: Swan Hill
Party	Candidate	Votes	%	±%
National	Barry Steggall	17,007	59.0	−16.4
Independent	Tom Bowles	6,270	21.8	+21.8
Labor	Vera Alcock	5,027	17.4	+0.6
Natural Law	Chris Hadzilias	505	1.8	+1.8
Total formal votes		28,809	98.3	+0.7
Informal votes		509	1.7	−0.7
Turnout		29,318	95.2	
Two-party-preferred result
National	Barry Steggall	19,782	69.0	−10.4
Labor	Vera Alcock	8,908	31.0	+10.4
National hold		Swing	−10.4	

=== Thomastown ===
1996 Victorian state election: Thomastown
Party	Candidate	Votes	%	±%
Labor	Peter Batchelor	22,235	70.9	+13.6
Liberal	Anthony Bradstreet	8,561	27.3	+3.3
Natural Law	Lester O'Donnell	543	1.7	+1.7
Total formal votes		31,339	99.6	+7.7
Informal votes		114	0.4	−7.7
Turnout		31,453	91.6	
Two-party-preferred result
Labor	Peter Batchelor	22,556	72.0	+2.0
Liberal	Anthony Bradstreet	8,776	28.0	−2.0
Labor hold		Swing	+2.0	

=== Tullamarine ===
1996 Victorian state election: Tullamarine
Party	Candidate	Votes	%	±%
Liberal	Bernie Finn	16,319	48.3	+4.1
Labor	David White	14,882	44.0	+4.0
Independent	Dot White	2,235	6.6	+6.6
Natural Law	Theo Andriopoulos	351	1.0	+1.0
Total formal votes		33,787	97.7	+2.2
Informal votes		784	2.3	−2.2
Turnout		15,858	47.0	−1.5
Two-party-preferred result
Liberal	Bernie Finn	17,887	53.0	+1.5
Labor	David White	15,858	47.0	−1.5
Liberal hold		Swing	+1.5	

=== Wantirna ===
1996 Victorian state election: Wantirna
Party	Candidate	Votes	%	±%
Liberal	Kim Wells	19,930	62.2	+2.8
Labor	Peter Bertolus	11,491	35.8	+4.6
Natural Law	Terrie Caven	645	2.0	+2.0
Total formal votes		32,066	98.0	+1.5
Informal votes		665	2.0	−1.5
Turnout		32,731	93.3	
Two-party-preferred result
Liberal	Kim Wells	20,240	63.1	−1.0
Labor	Peter Bertolus	11,814	36.9	+1.0
Liberal hold		Swing	−1.0	

=== Warrandyte ===
1996 Victorian state election: Warrandyte
Party	Candidate	Votes	%	±%
Liberal	Phil Honeywood	18,820	61.5	−1.9
Labor	Jenny Stray	9,310	30.4	+3.6
Independent	Louise Joy	2,123	6.9	+6.9
Natural Law	Juliana Kendi	371	1.2	+1.2
Total formal votes		30,624	98.5	+0.8
Informal votes		473	1.5	−0.8
Turnout		31,097	95.8	
Two-party-preferred result
Liberal	Phil Honeywood	19,549	63.9	−2.8
Labor	Jenny Stray	11,025	36.1	+2.8
Liberal hold		Swing	−2.8	

=== Warrnambool ===
1996 Victorian state election: Warrnambool
Party	Candidate	Votes	%	±%
National	John McGrath	18,357	57.8	−18.0
Labor	Peter Steele	9,071	28.6	+4.4
Independent	Maggie Lindop	3,986	12.6	+12.6
Natural Law	Lee Kenos	320	1.0	+1.0
Total formal votes		31,734	98.2	+0.2
Informal votes		595	1.8	−0.2
Turnout		32,329	95.9	
Two-party-preferred result
National	John McGrath	20,188	63.8	−12.0
Labor	Peter Steele	11,448	36.2	+12.0
National hold		Swing	−12.0	

=== Werribee ===
1996 Victorian state election: Werribee
Party	Candidate	Votes	%	±%
Labor	Mary Douglas	16,395	46.4	−2.2
Liberal	Trish Vejby	15,396	43.6	+8.8
Independent	Dennis McIntosh	3,560	10.1	+10.1
Total formal votes		35,351	97.5	+0.4
Informal votes		908	2.5	−0.4
Turnout		36,259	95.1	
Two-party-preferred result
Labor	Mary Douglas	17,943	50.8	−7.5
Liberal	Trish Vejby	17,386	49.2	+7.5
Labor hold		Swing	−7.5	

=== Williamstown ===
1996 Victorian state election: Williamstown
Party	Candidate	Votes	%	±%
Labor	Steve Bracks	19,440	63.9	+5.3
Liberal	Jeff Bird	10,116	33.3	+4.1
Natural Law	Yasmin Horsham	845	2.8	+2.8
Total formal votes		30,401	96.6	+2.3
Informal votes		1,069	3.4	−2.3
Turnout		31,470	92.7	
Two-party-preferred result
Labor	Steve Bracks	19,926	65.6	+1.4
Liberal	Jeff Bird	10,454	34.4	−1.4
Labor hold		Swing	+1.4	

=== Wimmera ===
1996 Victorian state election: Wimmera
Party	Candidate	Votes	%	±%
National	Bill McGrath	17,844	56.9	−22.7
Independent	Gary Cross	6,727	21.5	+21.5
Labor	Les Power	6,498	20.7	+0.3
Natural Law	Nick Kenos	282	0.9	+0.9
Total formal votes		31,351	98.6	+1.0
Informal votes		441	1.4	−1.0
Turnout		31,792	95.9	
Two-party-preferred result
National	Bill McGrath	22,275	71.2	−8.4
Labor	Les Power	9,023	28.8	+8.4
National hold		Swing	−8.4	

=== Yan Yean ===
1996 Victorian state election: Yan Yean
Party	Candidate	Votes	%	±%
Labor	Andre Haermeyer	16,264	50.3	+7.8
Liberal	Barb Jones	15,291	47.3	+3.2
Natural Law	David Snowman	796	2.5	−2.9
Total formal votes		32,351	97.7	+2.3
Informal votes		760	2.3	−2.3
Turnout		33,111	95.5	
Two-party-preferred result
Labor	Andre Haermeyer	16,700	51.6	−0.3
Liberal	Barb Jones	15,635	48.4	+0.3
Labor hold		Swing	−0.3	

== See also ==
- 1996 Victorian state election
- Candidates of the 1996 Victorian state election
- Members of the Victorian Legislative Assembly, 1996–1999
