= 1996 Doutta Galla Province state by-election =

A by-election was held for the Doutta Galla Province in the Victorian Legislative Council on 30 March 1996. The by-election was caused by the vacancy following the resignation of David White, who unsuccessfully contested the lower house seat of Tullamarine.

1996 Victorian state election: Doutta Galla by-election
| Party | Candidate | Votes | % | ±% |
|---|---|---|---|---|
| Labor | Tayfun Eren | 73,796 | 57.0 | +5.6 |
| Liberal | R McClymont | 48,506 | 37.5 | +1.3 |
| Independent | S Bingle | 7,103 | 5.5 | +5.5 |
| Total formal votes | | 129,405 | 95.6 | +2.2 |
| Informal votes | | 6,011 | 4.4 | −2.2 |
| Turnout | | 135,416 | 93.1 | |
Two-party-preferred result
| Labor | Tayfun Eren | 77,348 | 59.8 | |
| Liberal | R McClymont | 52,057 | 40.2 | |
| Labor hold | | Swing | | |
