= Electoral results for the Thomastown Province =

Victoria, Australia, district election results

This is a list of electoral results for the Thomastown Province in the Victorian state elections in Australia.

== Members for Thomastown Province ==
Member 1	Party	Year		
Dolph Eddy	Labor	1976	Member 2	Party
Dolph Eddy	Labor	1979	Glyde Butler	Labor
Jim Kennan	Labor	1982		

== Election results ==
=== Elections in the 1980s ===
1982 Victorian state election: Thomastown Province
Party	Candidate	Votes	%	±%
Labor	Jim Kennan	86,102	72.1	+3.7
Liberal	Rae Kennett	33,361	27.9	−3.7
Total formal votes		119,463	94.8	+0.3
Informal votes		6,488	5.2	−0.3
Turnout		125,951	94.7	+0.9
Labor hold		Swing	+3.7	

=== Elections in the 1970s ===
1979 Victorian state election: Thomastown Province
Party	Candidate	Votes	%	±%
Labor	Glyde Butler	75,172	68.4	+7.2
Liberal	Kathleen Mulraney	34,678	31.6	−7.2
Total formal votes		109,850	94.5	−1.0
Informal votes		6,395	5.5	+1.0
Turnout		116,245	93.8	+0.5
Labor hold		Swing	+7.2	

1976 Victorian state election: Thomastown Province
Party	Candidate	Votes	%	±%
Labor	Dolph Eddy	62,466	61.2	
Liberal	John Fletcher	39,546	38.8	
Total formal votes		102,012	95.5	
Informal votes		4,851	4.5	
Turnout		106,863	93.3	
Labor hold		Swing		
