= Glyde Butler =

Australian politician (1932–2000)

Glyde Algernon Surtees Butler (12 September 1932 – 18 September 2000) was an Australian politician.

British-born, he served in the Korean War and came to Australia in 1956, settling in Melbourne after a year at Pyramid Hill. He became involved in the union movement and the Labor Party, which he joined in 1959. A carpenter, he held the positions of vice-president (1964–67) and president (1968–71) of the Furnishing Trades Union, and senior vice-president (1966–79) and president (1965–67) of the Labor College. In 1966 he was senior vice-president of Victorian Young Labor, and he also worked as a party organiser from 1966 to 1969. In 1979 he was elected to the Victorian Legislative Council as the Labor member for Thomastown. In 1982 he was appointed government whip, but he left the Council in 1985, when Thomastown was abolished. Butler died in 2000.

Victorian Legislative Council
New seat	Member for Thomastown; 1979–1985; Served alongside: Dolph Eddy; Jim Kennan	Abolished
