= Doug Walpole =

Australian politician

Douglas Thompson Walpole (21 August 1942 – 15 March 2020) is a former Australian politician.

== Biography ==
He was born in Leeds, England, to Thompson Walpole, a tailor's cutter, and Nellie, née Allaway. The family migrated to Australia in 1955, and Doug attended Sunshine Technical School from 1956 to 1959, subsequently qualifying as an electrical mechanic at Footscray Technical College in 1962. He worked as a maintenance electrician from 1959 to 1973. In 1969 he joined the Labor Party. He was an organiser with the Electrical Trades Union from 1973 to 1991 and from 1976 to 1979 was president of the Bacchus Marsh branch of the Labor Party, as well as an executive member of the Ballarat Federal Electorate Committee. He also held party positions as a member of the Disputes Tribunal (1985–91), the Industrial Affairs Policy Committee (1986–92), the Foreign Affairs Policy Committee (1986–92), and the State Conference (1972–93), and worked as industrial officer of the Vehicle Builders Union from 1991 to 1992.

In 1992 Walpole was elected to the Victorian Legislative Council as a Labor member for Melbourne Province. He served as a backbencher until 1999, when he lost preselection and instead contested the safe Liberal province of East Yarra, at which he was defeated.

Walpole had three children with his first wife (Nola). He had three granddaughters & a great-grandson.

In 2005 he married his partner of six years, Jo Fox. From 2000 to 2014 they lived in Hobart.
