= John Ross (Victorian politician) =

Australian politician

John William Gamaliel Ross (17 October 1940 – 6 September 2003) was an Australian politician.

He was born in Melbourne to Jack Sutherland and Jean Lorraine Ross. He attended primary school at Gardenvale and Ormond and then Brighton Grammar School (1952–1958). He worked as a technical officer at the University of Melbourne until 1962, when he became an inspector with the Victorian Health Department. He qualified with a Bachelor of Science from the university in 1967, followed by a Master of Science in 1973 and a PhD in 1977; he would later serve as scientific officer and then chief research officer with the Health Department. He was also director of the Addiction Research Institute. In 1991 he left the Health Department to become chairman of the board of Break-Even/G-Line Counselling and Referral Service. He was also elected to Moorabbin City Council in 1991, serving until 1994 in which year he was Deputy Mayor.

Ross had been a member of the McKinnon branch of the Liberal Party since 1982, serving as its president from 1990 to 1995. He was also the branch's delegate to the Victorian State Council from 1991 to 1995, and served on the electorate committees for the state seat of Bentleigh (1991, chairman 1993–96) and the federal seats of Henty (1983–86) and Goldstein (1992–96). In 1996 he was elected to the Victorian Legislative Council as a Liberal member for Higinbotham Province, serving until his retirement in 2002. He died in Melbourne in 2003.
