= Dolph Eddy =

Australian politician (1918–1989)

Randolph John Eddy (2 May 1918 – 5 May 1989) was an Australian politician.

Born in Richmond to driver Randolph Edgar Eddy and Myrtle Truscott, he was educated at local state schools and Richmond Technical College, becoming a cabinet maker and upholsterer. On 29 July 1941 he married Hazel May Morgan, with whom he had two sons. He served in the Australian Imperial Force from 1943 to 1945 as a corporal in the Pacific Islands Light AA Unit. Having joined the Labor Party he became president of the Clifton Hill branch from 1952 to 1955 and president of the Furnishing Trade Union from 1959 to 1962. In 1955 he was elected to Collingwood City Council on which he would serve until 1976; he was mayor from 1957 to 1958 and from 1967 to 1968. In 1970 Eddy was elected to the Victorian Legislative Council for Doutta Galla Province, transferring to Thomastown in 1976. He was the opposition spokesman on social welfare from 1976 to 1979 and Labor whip from 1976 to 1982, when he lost preselection and retired.
