= Tayfun Eren =

Australian politician (born 1959)

Member of the Victorian Parliament for Doutta Galla
- In office May 1996 – August 1999
- Preceded by: David White
- Succeeded by: Justin Madden

Personal details
- Born: 13 March 1959 (age 67) Turkey
- Party: Labor Party
- Occupation: Sales/storeman; Electorate Officer

Tayfun Eren (born 13 March 1959) is a former Australian politician. He was a Labor member for Doutta Galla in the Victorian Legislative Council from 1996 to 1999.

== Career ==
Eren was elected in a by-election caused by the resignation of David White when White made an unsuccessful attempt to move to the Legislative Assembly seat of Tullamarine. He was the first person of Turkish birth to be elected to a Parliament in Australia. In 1999, Eren was disendorsed by the ALP following his involvement in a domestic violence court case.
