= David White (Australian politician) =

Australian politician

David Ronald White (born 16 June 1944) is a former Australian politician.

White was born in Melbourne to Cecil Ambrose White, a clerk and draper, and Phyllis Eileen. He attended state schools and received a Bachelor of Commerce, Bachelor of Arts and Master of Business Administration from Melbourne University. He joined the Labor Party in 1961, and was secretary of its North Melbourne branch in 1964. From 1966 to 1969 he was an audit clerk with Price Waterhouse & Company, and from 1971 to 1976 a research officer to the Victorian opposition leader. He was also a Melbourne City Councillor from 1974 to 1977.

In 1976 White was elected to the Victorian Legislative Council as a member for Doutta Galla. He was appointed Minister of Water Supply, Mines and Minerals and Energy in 1982, moving to Health in 1985 and Industry, Technology and Resources in 1989. From 1983 he was the party's deputy leader in the upper house, becoming leader from 1990 to 1993. He was Shadow Minister for Finance and Major Projects from 1992 to 1993 and Shadow Minister for Energy and Minerals from 1993 to 1996.

In 1996 White resigned from the Council to run for the Legislative Assembly seat of Tullamarine, but he was defeated. From 1996 to 1999 he was electorate officer for Senator Stephen Conroy, and from 2000 he was a director of Hawker Britton and chairman of Yarra Trams.

Victorian Legislative Council
Preceded by Dolph Eddy	Member for Doutta Galla; 1976–1996; Served alongside: Bill Landeryou; John Brumby; Monica Gould	Succeeded by Tayfun Eren
