= Monica Gould =

Australian politician (born 1957)

Monica Mary Gould (born 5 May 1957) is a former Australian politician. She was a Labor Party member of the Victorian Legislative Council between September 1993 and November 2006, representing Doutta Galla Province.

Gould was born in Melbourne, and finished her secondary studies at a technical college in the suburb of Macleod. She became involved in the Manufacturing Grocers Association trade union, which later merged with the National Union of Workers. In 1980, she became its General Vice-president – a position which she held until her election to parliament. She was also a member of the Australian Council of Trade Unions executive between 1991 and 1993.

In 1993, Gould decided to make a move into politics, and succeeded in securing Labor pre-selection for a by-election in the seat of Doutta Galla Province. During her first term, which was only three years, because of the circumstances of her election, she was a member of the Scrutiny of Acts and Regulations Committee. She was re-elected in 1996, and was subsequently appointed Deputy Leader of the Opposition in the Legislative Council and Shadow Minister for Aged Care. Gould also became a member of both the Law Reform and Legislative Council Privileges Committees.

In the months leading up to the 1999 election, Gould was again promoted – this time to the position of Leader of the Opposition in the Legislative Council. She was also made responsible for the Housing portfolio. In late 1999, the Labor Party won government, defeating Premier Jeff Kennett's Liberal government. Gould continued on as Leader of the Government in the Legislative Council, and continued her rise, becoming the Minister for Industrial Relations and Minister Assisting the Minister for WorkCover.

By February 2002, Gould was demoted. She was appointed to the new position of Minister for Education Services and Youth Affairs.

After the 2002 election, Gould was dumped from the ministry. She also lost her position as Leader of the Government in the Legislative Council, being replaced by John Lenders. She was subsequently appointed as the first woman President of the Legislative Council. She retired from Parliament at the 2006 election.

In March 2018 Gould was inducted into the Victorian Honour Roll of Women for her work encouraging women members of the Victorian branch in the Australian Labor Party.
