= 1996 Victorian state election =

Australian state election

- 30 March 1996

All 88 seats in the Victorian Legislative Assembly and 22 (of the 44) seats in the Victorian Legislative Council 45 seats needed for a majority
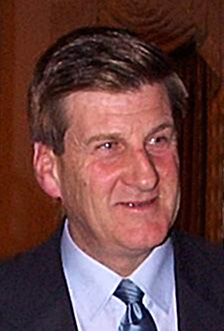

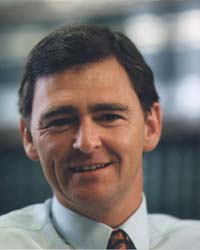
	First party	Second party
Leader	Jeff Kennett	John Brumby
Party	Liberal/National coalition	Labor
Leader since	23 April 1991	June 1993
Leader's seat	Burwood	Broadmeadows
Last election	61 seats	27 seats
Seats won	58	29
Seat change	▼3	▲2
Popular vote	1,397,352	1,189,475
Percentage	50.68%	43.13%
Swing	▼1.27	▲4.72
TPP	53.47%	46.53%
TPP swing	▼2.81	▲2.83
- Results in each electorate
Premier before election
Jeff Kennett
Liberal/National coalition
Elected Premier
Jeff Kennett
Liberal/National coalition

The 1996 Victorian state election, held on Saturday, 30 March 1996, was for the 53rd Parliament of Victoria. It was held in the Australian state of Victoria to elect all 88 members of the state's Legislative Assembly and 22 members of the 44-member Legislative Council. The election took place four weeks after the 1996 federal election which swept the Labor Party from power nationally.

The Liberal–National Coalition led by Jeff Kennett and Pat McNamara was returned for a second term. A swing against the government did not produce a significant seat transfer to the Labor Party, now led by John Brumby and still recovering from its landslide defeat at the October 1992 state election. While Labor obtained significant swings in safe Coalition seats, the marginal outer suburban electorates swung further towards the government. The overall two party preferred swing was 2.8% to Labor.

The first signs of rural discontent with the Kennett government began to appear at this election. Independent candidate Russell Savage won Mildura from the Liberals, while other independents polled strongly in the Coalition-held electorates of Benalla, Gippsland East, Polwarth and Rodney.

== Results ==
=== Legislative Assembly ===
Party	Votes	%	+/–	Seats	+/–
Liberal	1,212,933	43.98	▼0.17	49	▼3
Labor	1,189,475	43.13	▲4.72	29	▲2
National	184,419	6.69	▼1.14	9	Steady
Natural Law	51,231	1.86	▲0.54	0	Steady
Call to Australia	6,222	0.23	▲0.19	0	Steady
Independents	99,426	3.61	▼3.90	1	▲1
Other	13,964	0.51	▼0.22	0	Steady
Total	2,757,670	100.00	–	88	–
Valid votes	2,757,670	97.70			
Invalid/blank votes	64,964	2.30	▼1.51		
Total votes	2,822,634	100.00	–		
Registered voters/turnout	3,000,076	94.09	▼1.05		
Two-party-preferred
Liberal/National Coalition	1,472,365	53.47	▼2.83		
Labor	1,281,418	46.53	▲2.83		
Total	2,753,783	100.00	–		

=== Legislative Council ===
Results for the Legislative Council.

Victorian state election, 30 March 1996 Legislative Council
Enrolled voters	3,000,076				
Votes cast	2,826,467		Turnout	94.21	–1.01
Informal votes	72,800		Informal	2.58	–1.53
Summary of votes by party
Party	Primary votes	%	Swing	Seats won	Seats held
Liberal	1,208,168	43.87	+0.38	14	28
Labor	1,114,843	40.49	+1.93	5	10
National	182,494	6.63	–2.11	3	6
Democrats	157,798	5.73	+5.42	0	0
Democratic Labour	43,553	1.58	–2.96	0	0
Natural Law	14,129	0.51	–0.11	0	0
Call to Australia	5,576	0.20	+0.12	0	0
Friendly Migrant Workers	1,339	0.05	+0.05	0	0
Independent	25,767	0.94	–2.15	0	0
Total	2,753,667			22	44
Two-party-preferred
Liberal/National	1,482,617	53.96	–2.69		
Labor	1,264,879	46.04	+2.69		

== Seats changing hands ==
Seat	Pre-1996			Swing	Post-1996		
Seat	Party	Member	Margin	Swing	Margin	Member	Party
Bendigo West	Liberal	Max Turner	1.1	-2.8	1.7	Bob Cameron	Labor
Carrum	Labor	Mal Sandon	0.9	-1.7	0.8	David Lean	Liberal
Essendon	Liberal	Ian Davis	1.2	-4.6	3.6	Judy Maddigan	Labor
Ivanhoe	Liberal	Vin Heffernan	4.3	-5.9	1.6	Craig Langdon	Labor
Mildura	Liberal	Craig Bildstien	20.9	-22.3	1.4	Russell Savage	Independent

== Key dates ==
Date	Event
5 March 1996	The Legislative Council was prorogued and the Legislative Assembly was dissolved.
5 March 1996	Writs were issued by the Governor to proceed with an election.
8 March 1996	The electoral rolls were closed.
15 March 1996	Nominations for candidates for the election closed at noon.
30 March 1996	Polling day, between the hours of 8am and 6pm.
3 April 1996	The Kennett Ministry was re-constituted.
19 April 1996	The writ was returned and the results formally declared.

== See also ==
- Candidates of the 1996 Victorian state election
- Members of the Victorian Legislative Assembly, 1992–1996
- Members of the Victorian Legislative Assembly, 1996–1999
