= Doutta Galla Province =

Former electoral province of the Victorian Legislative Council, Australia

Doutta Galla Province Victoria—Legislative Council
- State: Victoria
- Created: 1937
- Abolished: 2006

Doutta Galla Province was an electorate of the Victorian Legislative Council until 2006. It was abolished from the 2006 state election in the wake of the Bracks Labor government's reform of the Legislative Council.

== Members ==
Members for Doutta Galla Province
Year	Member	Party	Member	Party
1937	Percy Clarey	Labor		
1940	Percy Clarey	Labor	Paul Jones	Labor
1943	Percy Clarey	Labor	Paul Jones	Labor
1946	Percy Clarey	Labor	Paul Jones	Labor
1949	Bill Slater	Labor	Paul Jones	Labor
1952	Bill Slater	Labor	Paul Jones	Labor
1955	Bill Slater	Labor	Paul Jones	Labor (A-C)
1955	Bill Slater	Labor	Paul Jones	Labor (A-C)
1958	Bill Slater	Labor	Samuel Merrifield	Labor
1960	John Tripovich	Labor	Samuel Merrifield	Labor
1961	John Tripovich	Labor	Samuel Merrifield	Labor
1964	John Tripovich	Labor	Samuel Merrifield	Labor
1967	John Tripovich	Labor	Samuel Merrifield	Labor
1970	John Tripovich	Labor	Dolph Eddy	Labor
1973	John Tripovich	Labor	Dolph Eddy	Labor
1976	John Tripovich	Labor	Bill Landeryou	Labor
1976	David White	Labor	Bill Landeryou	Labor
1979	David White	Labor	Bill Landeryou	Labor
1982	David White	Labor	Bill Landeryou	Labor
1985	David White	Labor	Bill Landeryou	Labor
1988	David White	Labor	Bill Landeryou	Labor
1992	David White	Labor	Bill Landeryou	Labor
1993	David White	Labor	John Brumby	Labor
1993	David White	Labor	Monica Gould	Labor
1996	Tayfun Eren	Labor	Monica Gould	Labor
1999	Justin Madden	Labor	Monica Gould	Labor
2002	Justin Madden	Labor	Monica Gould	Labor

== Election results ==
2002 Victorian state election: Doutta Galla Province
Party	Candidate	Votes	%	±%
Labor	Monica Gould	84,236	66.1	−0.4
Liberal	Christina Tutone	31,808	24.9	−8.6
Greens	Jules Beckwith	8,714	6.8	+6.8
Democrats	Robert Livesay	2,753	2.2	+2.2
Total formal votes		127,511	94.6	−0.3
Informal votes		7,210	5.4	+0.3
Turnout		134,721	93.1	
Two-party-preferred result
Labor	Monica Gould	91,581	71.9	+5.5
Liberal	Christina Tutone	35,797	28.1	−5.5
Labor hold		Swing	+5.5	
