= Members of the Victorian Legislative Council, 1988–1992 =

- ←1985–1988 1992–1996→

This is a list of members of the Victorian Legislative Council between 1988 and 1992. As half of the Legislative Council's terms expired at each periodic election, half of these members were elected at the 1985 state election with terms expiring in 1992, while the other half were elected at the 1988 state election with terms expiring in 1996.

Name	Party	Province	Term expires	Term of office
Gerald Ashman	Liberal	Boronia	1996	1988–2002
Bill Baxter	National	North Eastern	1992	1978–1984; 1985–2006
Ron Best	National	Western	1996	1988–2002
Mark Birrell	Liberal	East Yarra	1992	1983–2002
Bruce Chamberlain	Liberal	Western	1996	1976–2002
Geoffrey Connard	Liberal	Higinbotham	1996	1982–1996
George Cox	Liberal	Nunawading	1996	1988–1996
Joan Coxsedge	Labor	Melbourne West	1992	1979–1992
Geoff Craige	Liberal	Central Highlands	1996	1988–2002
George Crawford	Labor	Jika Jika	1992	1985–1992
Burwyn Davidson	Labor	Chelsea	1996	1988–1996
Dick de Fegely	Liberal	Ballarat	1992	1985–1999
David Evans	National	North Eastern	1996	1976–1996
James Guest	Liberal	Monash	1996	1976–1996
Peter Hall	National	Gippsland	1996	1988–2014
Roger Hallam	National	Western	1992	1985–2002
David Henshaw	Labor	Geelong	1996	1982–1996
Caroline Hogg	Labor	Melbourne North	1996	1982–1999
Alan Hunt	Liberal	South Eastern	1992	1961–1992
Bob Ives	Labor	Eumemmerring	1996	1988–1996
Cyril Kennedy	Labor	Waverley	1992	1979–1992
Rob Knowles	Liberal	Ballarat	1996	1976–1999
Licia Kokocinski	Labor	Melbourne West	1996	1988–1996
Bill Landeryou	Labor	Doutta Galla	1996	1976–1992
Robert Lawson	Liberal	Higinbotham	1992	1979–1992
Dick Long	Liberal	Gippsland	1992	1973–1992
Maureen Lyster	Labor	Chelsea	1992	1985–1992
Reg Macey	Liberal	Monash	1992	1985–1992
Rod Mackenzie	Independent^{[1]}	Geelong	1992	1979–1992
Jean McLean	Labor	Boronia	1992	1985–1999
Brian Mier	Labor	Waverley	1996	1982–1996
John Miles	Liberal	Templestowe	1992	1985–1992
Barry Pullen	Labor	Melbourne	1996	1982–1999
Giovanni Sgro	Labor	Melbourne North	1992	1979–1992
Bruce Skeggs	Liberal	Templestowe	1996	1988–1996
Ken Smith	Liberal	South Eastern	1996	1988–2002
Haddon Storey	Liberal	East Yarra	1996	1971–1996
Marie Tehan	Liberal	Central Highlands	1992	1987–1992
Theo Theophanous	Labor	Jika Jika	1996	1988–2010
Fred Van Buren	Labor	Eumemmerring	1992	1985–1992
Rosemary Varty	Liberal	Nunawading	1992	1985–1999
Evan Walker	Labor	Melbourne	1992	1979–1992
David White	Labor	Doutta Galla	1992	1976–1996
Ken Wright	National	North Western	1992	1973–1992

^{1} Rod Mackenzie formed a party called the Geelong Community Alliance, which stood candidates (including himself) at the 1992 election.

== Sources ==
- "Find a Member". State Government of Victoria.
