= Members of the Victorian Legislative Council, 1985–1988 =

- ←1982–1985 1988–1992→

This is a list of members of the Victorian Legislative Council between 1985 and 1988. As half of the Legislative Council's terms expired at each periodic election, half of these members were elected at the 1982 state election with terms expiring in 1988, while the other half were elected at the 1985 state election with terms expiring in 1992.

Until the passage of the Constitution (Duration of Parliament) Act 1984 (No. 10106), one of several reforms enacted by the Cain Labor government, elections for the Legislative Assembly were termed the "triennial elections", but they were renamed "periodic elections" with the duration of Parliaments after 1988 being extended to four years.

A redistribution in 1984 took effect from the 1985 election.

Name	Party	Province	Term expires	Term of office
Mike Arnold	Labor	Templestowe	1988	1982–1988
Bill Baxter	National	North Eastern	1992	1978–1984; 1985–2006
Mark Birrell	Liberal	East Yarra	1992	1983–2002
Bruce Chamberlain	Liberal	Western	1988	1976–2002
Geoffrey Connard	Liberal	Higinbotham	1988	1982–1996
Joan Coxsedge	Labor	Melbourne West	1992	1979–1992
George Crawford	Labor	Jika Jika	1992	1985–1992
Dick de Fegely	Liberal	Ballarat	1992	1985–1999
Judith Dixon	Labor	Boronia	1988	1982–1988
Bernie Dunn	National	North Western	1988	1969–1988
David Evans	National	North Eastern	1988	1976–1996
Jock Granter	Liberal	Central Highlands	1988	1964–1988
Fred Grimwade ^{[2]}	Liberal	Central Highlands	1992	1967–1987
James Guest	Liberal	Monash	1988	1976–1996
Roger Hallam	Liberal	Western	1992	1985–2002
David Henshaw	Labor	Geelong	1988	1982–1996
Caroline Hogg	Labor	Melbourne North	1988	1982–1999
Alan Hunt	Liberal	South Eastern	1992	1961–1992
Jim Kennan	Labor	Thomastown	1988	1982–1988
Cyril Kennedy	Labor	Waverley	1992	1979–1992
Joan Kirner	Labor	Melbourne West	1988	1982–1988
Rob Knowles	Liberal	Ballarat	1988	1976–1999
Bill Landeryou	Labor	Doutta Galla	1988	1976–1992
Robert Lawson	Liberal	Higinbotham	1992	1979–1992
Dick Long	Liberal	Gippsland	1992	1973–1992
Maureen Lyster	Labor	Chelsea	1992	1985–1992
Laurie McArthur	Labor	Nunawading	1988	1982–1988
Reg Macey	Liberal	Monash	1992	1985–1992
Rod Mackenzie	Labor/Independent ^{[3]}	Geelong	1992	1979–1992
Jean McLean	Labor	Boronia	1992	1985–1999
Brian Mier	Labor	Waverley	1988	1982–1996
John Miles	Liberal	Templestowe	1992	1985–1992
Barry Murphy	Labor	Gippsland	1988	1982–1988
Barry Pullen	Labor	Melbourne	1988	1982–1999
Bruce Reid	Liberal	Bendigo	1988	1976–1988
Mal Sandon	Labor	Chelsea	1988	1982–1988
Giovanni Sgro	Labor	Melbourne North	1992	1979–1992
Haddon Storey	Liberal	East Yarra	1988	1971–1996
Marie Tehan ^{[2]}	Liberal	Central Highlands	1992	1987–1992
Fred Van Buren	Labor	Eumemmerring	1992	1985–1992
Rosemary Varty ^{[1]}	Liberal	Nunawading	1992	1985–1999
Evan Walker	Labor	Melbourne	1992	1979–1992
Roy Ward	Liberal	South Eastern	1988	1970–1988
David White	Labor	Doutta Galla	1992	1976–1996
Ken Wright	National	North Western	1992	1973–1992

^{1} The result in Nunawading Province was extremely close at the 1985 election, and Labor candidate Bob Ives was initially declared the victor. The result was overturned by the Court of Disputed Returns before he could take his seat, and Liberal candidate Rosemary Varty won the resulting by-election in August 1985.
^{2} In February 1987, Central Highlands Liberal MLC Fred Grimwade resigned. Liberal candidate Marie Tehan won the resulting by-election in April.
^{3} Geelong MLC Rod Mackenzie was elected as a representative of the Labor Party, but resigned from the party on 14 December 1987. He served out the remainder of his term as an independent.

== Sources ==
- "Find a Member". State Government of Victoria.
