= Results of the 1985 Victorian state election (Legislative Council) =

Australian state election results

Victorian state election, 2 March 1985 Legislative Council << 1982–1988 >>
Enrolled voters	2,641,477				
Votes cast	2,461,708		Turnout	93.19	–0.67
Informal votes	74,202		Informal	3.01	–0.12
Summary of votes by party
Party	Primary votes	%	Swing	Seats won	Seats held
Labor	1,128,747	47.28	–2.28	11	23
Liberal	982,418	41.15	+1.94	8	16
National	159,299	6.67	+1.17	3	5
Democrats	95,045	3.98	–1.05	0	0
Call to Australia	16,849	0.71	+0.71	0	0
Independent	5,148	0.22	+0.04	0	0
Total	2,387,506			22	44

This is a list of Legislative Council results for the Victorian 1985 state election. 22 of the 44 seats were contested.

== Results by province ==
=== Ballarat ===
1985 Victorian state election: Ballarat Province
Party	Candidate	Votes	%	±%
Liberal	Dick de Fegely	55,702	49.0	
Labor	Roger Lowrey	49,966	44.0	
Democrats	William Ross	8,009	7.0	
Total formal votes		113,677	98.0	
Informal votes		2,347	2.0	
Turnout		116,024	94.8	
Two-party-preferred result
Liberal	Dick de Fegely	57,851	50.9	−1.0
Labor	Roger Lowrey	55,806	49.1	+1.0
Liberal hold		Swing	−1.0	

=== Boronia ===
1985 Victorian state election: Boronia Province
Party	Candidate	Votes	%	±%
Liberal	Gerald Clarke	51,150	48.0	
Labor	Jean McLean	48,531	45.6	
Democrats	Sid Spindler	6,831	6.4	
Total formal votes		106,512	97.5	
Informal votes		2,761	2.5	
Turnout		109,273	95.0	
Two-party-preferred result
Labor	Jean McLean	53,794	50.5	−1.6
Liberal	Gerald Clarke	52,712	49.5	+1.6
Labor gain from Liberal		Swing	−1.6	

=== Central Highlands ===
1985 Victorian state election: Central Highlands Province
Party	Candidate	Votes	%	±%
Liberal	Fred Grimwade	51,045	46.7	
Labor	Peter Fennell	46,570	42.6	
Democrats	Janet Powell	5,920	5.4	
Call to Australia	Brent Melville	5,763	5.3	
Total formal votes		109,298	97.7	
Informal votes		2,622	2.3	
Turnout		111,920	93.3	
Two-party-preferred result
Liberal	Fred Grimwade	58,298	53.3	+2.4
Labor	Peter Fennell	50,958	46.7	−2.4
Liberal hold		Swing	+2.4	

=== Chelsea ===
1985 Victorian state election: Chelsea Province
Party	Candidate	Votes	%	±%
Labor	Maureen Lyster	55,866	52.2	
Liberal	Michael Herbst	51,171	47.8	
Total formal votes		107,037	97.0	
Informal votes		3,321	3.0	
Turnout		110,358	93.2	
Labor hold		Swing	−2.9	

=== Doutta Galla ===
1985 Victorian state election: Doutta Galla Province
Party	Candidate	Votes	%	±%
Labor	David White	68,820	63.9	
Liberal	Pamela Philpot	38,898	36.1	
Total formal votes		107,718	95.2	
Informal votes		5,462	4.8	
Turnout		113,180	94.2	
Labor hold		Swing	−6.0	

=== East Yarra ===
1985 Victorian state election: East Yarra Province
Party	Candidate	Votes	%	±%
Liberal	Mark Birrell	63,782	58.0	
Labor	Bernard Ziegenbein	37,766	34.3	
Democrats	Margaret Cole	8,490	7.7	
Total formal votes		110,038	97.7	
Informal votes		2,616	2.3	
Turnout		112,654	92.0	
Two-party-preferred result
Liberal	Mark Birrell	68,003	61.8	+4.4
Labor	Bernard Ziegenbein	42,035	38.2	−4.4
Liberal hold		Swing	+3.4	

=== Eumemmerring ===
1985 Victorian state election: Eumemmerring Province
Party	Candidate	Votes	%	±%
Labor	Fred Van Buren	62,352	59.8	
Liberal	John Ferwerda	41,846	40.2	
Total formal votes		104,198	95.4	
Informal votes		5,042	4.6	
Turnout		109,240	93.5	
Labor hold		Swing	+0.9	

=== Geelong ===
1985 Victorian state election: Geelong Province
Party	Candidate	Votes	%	±%
Labor	Rod Mackenzie	58,009	53.1	
Liberal	Joss Manders	45,661	41.8	
Democrats	Laurence Levy	5,604	5.1	
Total formal votes		109,274	97.5	
Informal votes		2,796	2.5	
Turnout		112,070	94.2	
Two-party-preferred result
Labor	Rod Mackenzie	60,867	55.7	−1.1
Liberal	Joss Manders	48,407	44.3	+1.1
Labor hold		Swing	−1.1	

=== Gippsland ===
1985 Victorian state election: Gippsland Province
Party	Candidate	Votes	%	±%
Labor	Reginald Smith	40,085	37.0	
Liberal	Dick Long	31,055	28.7	
National	Anthony Stewart	27,839	25.7	
Call to Australia	Cornelius Gordyn	4,615	4.3	
Democrats	Catherine Stewart	2,649	2.5	
Independent	Ben Buckley	2,005	1.9	
Total formal votes		108,248	97.7	
Informal votes		2,576	2.3	
Turnout		110,824	93.4	
Two-party-preferred result
Liberal	Dick Long	61,780	57.1	+4.7
Labor	Reginald Smith	46,328	42.9	−4.7
Liberal hold		Swing	+4.7	

=== Higinbotham ===
1985 Victorian state election: Higinbotham Province
Party	Candidate	Votes	%	±%
Liberal	Robert Lawson	57,733	52.4	
Labor	Denis Oakley	45,329	41.2	
Democrats	Anton Hermann	7,039	6.4	
Total formal votes		110,101	97.3	
Informal votes		3,113	2.7	
Turnout		113,214	92.4	
Two-party-preferred result
Liberal	Robert Lawson	61,216	55.6	+2.3
Labor	Denis Oakley	48,885	44.4	−2.3
Liberal hold		Swing	+2.3	

=== Jika Jika ===
1985 Victorian state election: Jika Jika Province
Party	Candidate	Votes	%	±%
Labor	George Crawford	73,242	67.9	
Liberal	David Gandolfo	34,690	32.1	
Total formal votes		107,932	95.5	
Informal votes		5,058	4.5	
Turnout		112,990	92.5	
Labor hold		Swing	−2.1	

=== Melbourne ===
1985 Victorian state election: Melbourne Province
Party	Candidate	Votes	%	±%
Labor	Evan Walker	65,653	63.2	
Liberal	Vincent Volpe	31,621	30.4	
Democrats	Simon James	6,560	6.3	
Total formal votes		103,834	95.4	
Informal votes		4,966	4.6	
Turnout		108,800	88.6	
Two-party-preferred result
Labor	Evan Walker	68,946	66.4	−4.5
Liberal	Vincent Volpe	34,888	33.6	+4.5
Labor hold		Swing	−4.5	

=== Melbourne North ===
1985 Victorian state election: Melbourne North Province
Party	Candidate	Votes	%	±%
Labor	Giovanni Sgro	71,366	67.6	
Liberal	Brett Pullyblank	34,135	32.4	
Total formal votes		105,501	95.2	
Informal votes		5,359	4.8	
Turnout		110,860	93.6	
Labor hold		Swing	−4.1	

=== Melbourne West ===
1985 Victorian state election: Melbourne West Province
Party	Candidate	Votes	%	±%
Labor	Joan Coxsedge	68,229	62.9	
Liberal	Matthew Matich	31,474	29.0	
Democrats	Johannus Paas	8,821	8.1	
Total formal votes		108,524	95.7	
Informal votes		4,929	4.3	
Turnout		113,453	92.4	
Two-party-preferred result
Labor	Joan Coxsedge	72,603	66.9	−4.8
Liberal	Matthew Matich	35,921	33.1	+4.8
Labor hold		Swing	−4.8	

=== Monash ===
1985 Victorian state election: Monash Province
Party	Candidate	Votes	%	±%
Liberal	Reg Macey	51,526	48.8	
Labor	Bob Miller	48,071	45.5	
Democrats	David Collyer	6,033	5.7	
Total formal votes		105,630	96.9	
Informal votes		3,352	3.1	
Turnout		108,982	89.0	
Two-party-preferred result
Liberal	Reg Macey	53,433	50.6	+2.1
Labor	Bob Miller	52,177	49.4	−2.1
Liberal hold		Swing	+2.1	

=== North Eastern ===
1985 Victorian state election: North Eastern Province
Party	Candidate	Votes	%	±%
National	Bill Baxter	56,159	51.0	
Labor	Ewan Paterson	27,239	24.7	
Liberal	Stephen Blair	23,557	21.4	
Independent	Michael Else	3,143	2.9	
Total formal votes		110,098	97.7	
Informal votes		2,624	2.3	
Turnout		112,722	93.4	
Two-party-preferred result
National	Bill Baxter	75,747	68.8	0.0
Labor	Ewan Paterson	34,351	31.2	0.0
National hold		Swing	0.0	

=== North Western ===
1985 Victorian state election: North Western Province
Party	Candidate	Votes	%	±%
National	Ken Wright	41,144	37.6	
Labor	Phillip Eddy	36,168	33.1	
Liberal	Bill Ebery	32,041	29.3	
Total formal votes		109,353	98.2	
Informal votes		2,048	1.8	
Turnout		111,401	94.2	
Two-party-preferred result
National	Ken Wright	68,412	62.6	+16.2
Labor	Phillip Eddy	40,867	37.4	−16.2
National hold		Swing	+16.2	

=== Nunawading ===
1985 Victorian state election: Nunawading Province
Party	Candidate	Votes	%	±%
Liberal	Rosemary Varty	50,584	46.1	
Labor	Bob Ives	50,220	45.8	
Democrats	Michael Nardella	8,855	8.1	
Total formal votes		109,659	97.7	
Informal votes		2,561	2.3	
Turnout		112,220	94.0	
Two-party-preferred result
Labor	Bob Ives	54,822*	50.0	−3.6
Liberal	Rosemary Varty	54,821	50.0	+3.6
Labor gain from Liberal		Swing	−3.6	

- Includes the casting vote by the returning officer.
- This result was overturned by the Court of Disputed Returns and a by-election was held.

=== South Eastern ===
1985 Victorian state election: South Eastern Province
Party	Candidate	Votes	%	±%
Liberal	Alan Hunt	60,266	53.2	
Labor	Bora Eric	45,784	40.5	
Democrats	Irene Fisher	7,117	6.3	
Total formal votes		113,167	97.8	
Informal votes		2,567	2.2	
Turnout		115,734	93.7	
Two-party-preferred result
Liberal	Alan Hunt	63,713	56.3	+2.7
Labor	Bora Eric	49,454	43.7	−2.7
Liberal hold		Swing	+2.7	

=== Templestowe ===
1985 Victorian state election: Templestowe Province
Party	Candidate	Votes	%	±%
Liberal	John Miles	53,726	49.7	
Labor	Gary Greenway	45,433	42.0	
Democrats	Kenneth Peak	8,917	8.3	
Total formal votes		108,076	97.5	
Informal votes		2,756	2.5	
Turnout		110,832	93.9	
Two-party-preferred result
Liberal	John Miles	57,104	52.8	+2.3
Labor	Gary Greenway	50,958	47.2	−2.3
Liberal hold		Swing	+2.3	

=== Waverley ===
1985 Victorian state election: Waverley Province
Party	Candidate	Votes	%	±%
Labor	Cyril Kennedy	53,713	48.9	
Liberal	Robert Clark	45,362	41.3	
Call to Australia	William Watson	6,471	5.9	
Democrats	Jeffrey McAlpine	4,200	3.8	
Total formal votes		109,746	96.9	
Informal votes		3,524	3.1	
Turnout		113,270	93.8	
Two-party-preferred result
Labor	Cyril Kennedy	59,921	54.6	+0.8
Liberal	Robert Clark	49,825	45.4	−0.8
Labor hold		Swing	+0.8	

=== Western ===
1985 Victorian state election: Western Province
Party	Candidate	Votes	%	±%
Liberal	Henry Wyld	45,393	41.3	
National	Roger Hallam	34,157	31.1	
Labor	Brian Clarke	30,335	27.6	
Total formal votes		109,885	98.4	
Informal votes		1,802	1.6	
Turnout		111,687	95.3	
Two-candidate-preferred result
National	Roger Hallam	60,064	54.7	
Liberal	Henry Wyld	49,821	45.3	
National gain from Liberal		Swing	N/A	

== See also ==
- 1985 Victorian state election
- Members of the Victorian Legislative Council, 1985–1988
