= Electoral results for the Geelong Province =

Victoria, Australia, district election results

This is a list of electoral results for the Geelong Province in Victorian state elections.

== Members for Geelong Province ==
Member 1	Party	Year		
Glyn Jenkins	Liberal	1976	Member 2	Party
Glyn Jenkins	Liberal	1979	Rod Mackenzie	Labor
David Henshaw	Labor	1982	Rod Mackenzie	Labor
David Henshaw	Labor	1985	Rod Mackenzie	Labor
David Henshaw	Labor	1987	Rod Mackenzie	Independent
David Henshaw	Labor	1988	Rod Mackenzie	Independent
David Henshaw	Labor	1992	Bill Hartigan	Liberal
Ian Cover	Liberal	1996	Bill Hartigan	Liberal
Ian Cover	Liberal	1999	Elaine Carbines	Labor
John Eren	Labor	2002	Elaine Carbines	Labor

== Election results ==
=== Elections in the 2000s ===
2002 Victorian state election: Geelong Province
Party	Candidate	Votes	%	±%
Labor	John Eren	72,683	51.2	+5.7
Liberal	Ian Cover	51,059	36.0	−9.2
Greens	Bruce Murray	11,904	8.4	+4.3
Democrats	Erica Menheere-Thompson	3,255	2.3	−2.9
Christian Democrats	Alan Barron	1,826	1.3	+1.3
Independent	Val Nicholls	1,144	0.8	+0.8
Total formal votes		141,871	97.0	−0.5
Informal votes		4,395	3.0	+0.5
Turnout		146,266	94.3	
Two-party-preferred result
Labor	John Eren	86,253	60.8	+8.8
Liberal	Ian Cover	55,564	39.2	−8.8
Labor gain from Liberal		Swing	+8.8	

=== Elections in the 1990s ===
1999 Victorian state election: Geelong Province
Party	Candidate	Votes	%	±%
Liberal	Bill Hartigan	58,390	45.7	−5.5
Labor	Elaine Carbines	57,389	44.9	+1.6
Democrats	Robyn Hodge	6,540	5.1	+0.6
Greens	Adrian Whitehead	5,568	4.4	+4.4
Total formal votes		127,887	97.4	−0.3
Informal votes		3,350	2.6	+0.3
Turnout		131,237	94.6	
Two-party-preferred result
Labor	Elaine Carbines	65,790	51.4	+4.7
Liberal	Bill Hartigan	62,097	48.6	−4.7
Labor gain from Liberal		Swing	+4.7	

1996 Victorian state election: Geelong Province
Party	Candidate	Votes	%	±%
Liberal	Ian Cover	63,930	51.2	+6.7
Labor	Carole Marple	54,008	43.3	+3.3
Democrats	Gerald Desmarais	5,599	4.5	+4.5
Democratic Labor	Bill Verhoef	1,332	1.1	−0.4
Total formal votes		124,869	97.8	+1.3
Informal votes		2,852	2.2	−1.3
Turnout		127,721	95.6	
Two-party-preferred result
Liberal	Ian Cover	66,366	53.3	+0.1
Labor	Carole Marple	58,143	46.7	−0.1
Liberal gain from Labor		Swing	+0.1	

1992 Victorian state election: Geelong Province
Party	Candidate	Votes	%	±%
Liberal	Bill Hartigan	52,698	44.5	+2.0
Labor	Jan Alen	47,263	39.9	−8.6
Geelong Community	Rod Mackenzie	14,586	12.3	+12.3
Call to Australia	Ian Winter	2,168	1.8	−3.0
Democratic Labor	Paul Cahill	1,713	1.4	+1.4
Total formal votes		118,428	96.5	0.0
Informal votes		4,318	3.5	0.0
Turnout		122,746	95.5	
Two-party-preferred result
Liberal	Bill Hartigan	62,863	53.2	+4.3
Labor	Jan Alen	55,346	46.8	−4.3
Liberal gain from Labor		Swing	+4.3	

=== Elections in the 1980s ===
1988 Victorian state election: Geelong Province
Party	Candidate	Votes	%	±%
Labor	David Henshaw	54,291	48.4	−4.7
Liberal	John Lucas	47,838	42.7	+0.9
Call to Australia	Dirk Terpstra	5,363	4.8	+4.8
Independent	James Jordan	4,623	4.1	+4.1
Total formal votes		112,115	96.5	−1.0
Informal votes		4,108	3.5	+1.0
Turnout		116,223	93.1	−1.1
Two-party-preferred result
Labor	David Henshaw	57,218	51.1	−4.6
Liberal	John Lucas	54,857	48.9	+4.6
Labor hold		Swing	−4.6	

1985 Victorian state election: Geelong Province
Party	Candidate	Votes	%	±%
Labor	Rod Mackenzie	58,009	53.1	
Liberal	Joss Manders	45,661	41.8	
Democrats	Laurence Levy	5,604	5.1	
Total formal votes		109,274	97.5	
Informal votes		2,796	2.5	
Turnout		112,070	94.2	
Two-party-preferred result
Labor	Rod Mackenzie	60,867	55.7	−1.1
Liberal	Joss Manders	48,407	44.3	+1.1
Labor hold		Swing	−1.1	

1982 Victorian state election: Geelong Province
Party	Candidate	Votes	%	±%
Labor	David Henshaw	48,457	55.7	+6.7
Liberal	Glyn Jenkins	35,872	41.2	−5.9
Democratic Labor	Michael O'Keefe	2,711	3.1	−0.8
Total formal votes		87,040	97.2	+0.2
Informal votes		2,458	2.8	−0.2
Turnout		89,498	94.5	+0.3
Two-party-preferred result
Labor	David Henshaw		56.5	+5.6
Liberal	Glyn Jenkins		43.5	−5.6
Labor gain from Liberal		Swing	+5.6	

- Two party preferred vote was estimated.

=== Elections in the 1970s ===
1979 Victorian state election: Geelong Province
Party	Candidate	Votes	%	±%
Labor	Rod Mackenzie	40,564	49.0	+1.5
Liberal	Gordon Hall	39,047	47.2	−5.3
Democratic Labor	James Jordan	3,212	3.9	+3.9
Total formal votes		82,823	97.0	+0.1
Informal votes		2,586	3.0	−0.1
Turnout		85,409	94.2	−1.5
Two-party-preferred result
Labor	Rod Mackenzie	42,133	50.9	+3.4
Liberal	Gordon Hall	40,690	49.1	−3.4
Labor gain from Liberal		Swing	+3.4	

1976 Victorian state election: Geelong Province
Party	Candidate	Votes	%	±%
Liberal	Glyn Jenkins	41,401	52.5	
Labor	Rod Mackenzie	37,413	47.5	
Total formal votes		78,814	96.9	
Informal votes		2,544	3.1	
Turnout		81,358	95.7	
Liberal hold		Swing		
