= Electoral results for the Waverley Province =

Victoria, Australia, district election results

This is a list of electoral results for the Waverley Province in Victorian state elections.

== Members for Waverley Province ==
Member 1	Party	Year		
Don Saltmarsh	Liberal	1976	Member 2	Party
Don Saltmarsh	Liberal	1979	Cyril Kennedy	Labor
Tony Van Vliet^{[d]}	Labor	1982	Cyril Kennedy	Labor
Brian Mier	Labor	1982	Cyril Kennedy	Labor
Brian Mier	Labor	1985	Cyril Kennedy	Labor
Brian Mier	Labor	1988	Cyril Kennedy	Labor
Brian Mier	Labor	1992	Andrew Brideson	Liberal
Maree Luckins	Liberal	1996	Andrew Brideson	Liberal
Maree Luckins	Liberal	1999	Andrew Brideson	Liberal
John Lenders	Labor	2002	Andrew Brideson	Liberal

^{[d]} Vliet died 16 October 1982

== Election results ==
=== Elections in the 2000s ===
2002 Victorian state election: Waverley Province
Party	Candidate	Votes	%	±%
Labor	John Lenders	67,950	54.0	+6.2
Liberal	Denise McGill	43,226	34.3	−9.7
Greens	Heather Welsh	11,238	8.9	+8.8
Democrats	Polly Morgan	3,447	2.7	−4.3
Total formal votes		125,861	96.2	+0.4
Informal votes		4,915	3.8	−0.4
Turnout		130,776	92.9	
Two-party-preferred result
Labor	John Lenders	78,478	62.4	+9.8
Liberal	Denise McGill	47,362	37.6	−9.8
Labor hold		Swing	+9.8	

=== Elections in the 1990s ===
1999 Victorian state election: Waverley Province
Party	Candidate	Votes	%	±%
Liberal	Andrew Brideson	57,252	47.0	−3.9
Labor	Stuart Morris	54,573	44.8	+4.3
Democrats	Polly Morgan	9,869	8.1	+1.2
Total formal votes		121,694	96.3	−1.1
Informal votes		4,686	3.7	+1.1
Turnout		126,380	93.1	
Two-party-preferred result
Liberal	Andrew Brideson	61,735	50.7	−4.1
Labor	Stuart Morris	59,959	49.3	+4.1
Liberal hold		Swing	−4.1	

1996 Victorian state election: Waverley Province
Party	Candidate	Votes	%	±%
Liberal	Maree Luckins	62,281	50.9	−1.7
Labor	Garth Head	49,573	40.5	+1.2
Democrats	Richard Grummet	8,450	6.9	+6.9
Democratic Labor	Matt Cody	1,960	1.6	−2.2
Total formal votes		122,264	97.4	+2.5
Informal votes		3,266	2.6	−2.5
Turnout		125,530	94.0	
Two-party-preferred result
Liberal	Maree Luckins	66,917	54.8	−0.1
Labor	Garth Head	55,085	45.2	+0.1
Liberal gain from Labor		Swing	−0.1	

1992 Victorian state election: Waverley Province
Party	Candidate	Votes	%	±%
Liberal	Andrew Brideson	63,180	52.6	+4.6
Labor	Cyril Kennedy	47,270	39.4	−12.6
Democratic Labor	Matthew Cody	4,615	3.8	+3.8
Independent	Elizabeth Billing	3,349	2.8	+2.8
Independent	Stephen Bingle	1,616	1.3	+1.3
Total formal votes		120,030	94.9	−0.1
Informal votes		6,420	5.1	+0.1
Turnout		126,450	96.0	
Two-party-preferred result
Liberal	Andrew Brideson	65,806	54.9	+6.9
Labor	Cyril Kennedy	54,013	45.1	−6.9
Liberal gain from Labor		Swing	+6.9	

=== Elections in the 1980s ===
1988 Victorian state election: Waverley Province
Party	Candidate	Votes	%	±%
Labor	Brian Mier	56,169	53.7	+4.8
Liberal	Savvas Grigoropoulos	48,381	46.3	+5.0
Total formal votes		104,550	95.3	−1.6
Informal votes		5,157	4.7	+1.6
Turnout		109,707	92.7	−1.1
Labor hold		Swing	−0.9	

1985 Victorian state election: Waverley Province
Party	Candidate	Votes	%	±%
Labor	Cyril Kennedy	53,713	48.9	
Liberal	Robert Clark	45,362	41.3	
Call to Australia	William Watson	6,471	5.9	
Democrats	Jeffrey McAlpine	4,200	3.8	
Total formal votes		109,746	96.9	
Informal votes		3,524	3.1	
Turnout		113,270	93.8	
Two-party-preferred result
Labor	Cyril Kennedy	59,921	54.6	+0.8
Liberal	Robert Clark	49,825	45.4	−0.8
Labor hold		Swing	+0.8	

1982 Waverley Province state by-election
Party	Candidate	Votes	%	±%
Labor	Brian Mier	55,983	50.3	+1.4
Liberal	Bruce Atkinson	47,061	42.3	+1.2
Democrats	Kenneth Mylius	4,644	4.2	−2.8
Democratic Labor	Edward Wood	3,240	2.9	−0.2
Independent	Wilfrid Thiele	373	0.3	+0.3
Total formal votes		111,301	97.0	+0.2
Informal votes		3,476	3.0	−0.2
Turnout		114,777	87.9	−6.8
Two-party-preferred result
Labor	Brian Mier		53.2	−0.8
Liberal	Bruce Atkinson		46.8	+0.8
Labor hold		Swing	−0.8	

- This by-election was caused by the death of Tony Van Vliet. Two party preferred vote was estimated.

1982 Victorian state election: Waverley Province
Party	Candidate	Votes	%	±%
Labor	Tony Van Vliet	57,047	48.9	+4.1
Liberal	Brian Joyce	47,938	41.2	−2.9
Democrats	Kenneth Mylius	8,114	6.9	−1.1
Democratic Labor	E.J. Woods	3,634	3.1	+3.1
Total formal votes		116,733	96.8	+0.9
Informal votes		3,843	3.2	−0.9
Turnout		120,576	94.7	+1.2
Two-party-preferred result
Labor	Tony Van Vliet	62,982	54.0	+3.4
Liberal	Brian Joyce	53,751	46.0	−3.4
Labor gain from Liberal		Swing	+3.4	

=== Elections in the 1970s ===
1979 Victorian state election: Waverley Province
Party	Candidate	Votes	%	±%
Labor	Cyril Kennedy	49,097	44.8	+2.0
Liberal	William McDonald	48,309	44.1	−13.1
Democrats	Frederick Steinicke	8,813	8.1	+8.1
Independent	Stephen Buttery	3,284	3.0	+3.0
Total formal votes		109,503	95.9	−0.6
Informal votes		4,675	4.1	+0.6
Turnout		114,178	93.5	+0.2
Two-party-preferred result
Labor	Cyril Kennedy	55,376	50.6	+6.3
Liberal	William McDonald	54,127	49.4	−6.3
Labor gain from Liberal		Swing	+6.3	

1976 Victorian state election: Waverley Province
Party	Candidate	Votes	%	±%
Liberal	Don Saltmarsh	59,058	57.2	
Labor	Anthony Scarcella	44,146	42.8	
Total formal votes		103,204	96.5	
Informal votes		3,754	3.5	
Turnout		106,958	93.3	
Liberal hold		Swing		
