= Electoral results for the Nunawading Province =

Victoria, Australia, district election results

This is a list of electoral results for the Nunawading Province in Victorian state elections.

== Members for Nunawading Province ==
Member 1	Party	Year		
Vernon Hauser	Liberal	1976	Member 2	Party
Vernon Hauser	Liberal	1979	Peter Block	Liberal
Laurie McArthur	Labor	1982	Peter Block	Liberal
Laurie McArthur	Labor	1985	Bob Ives	Labor
Laurie McArthur	Labor	1985	Rosemary Varty	Liberal
George Cox	Liberal	1988	Rosemary Varty	Liberal

== Election results ==
=== Elections in the 1980s ===
1988 Victorian state election: Nunawading Province
Party	Candidate	Votes	%	±%
Liberal	George Cox	56,764	51.1	+5.0
Labor	Laurie McArthur	54,308	48.9	+3.1
Total formal votes		111,072	96.7	−1.0
Informal votes		3,782	3.3	+1.0
Turnout		114,854	93.4	−0.6
Liberal gain from Labor		Swing	+1.1	

1985 Nunawading Province state by-election
Party	Candidate	Votes	%	±%
Liberal	Rosemary Varty	51,006	49.2	+3.1
Labor	Bob Ives	40,578	39.2	−6.6
Democrats	Michael Nardella	4,760	4.6	−3.5
Call to Australia	William Watson	2,682	2.6	+2.6
Nuclear Disarmament	Jennifer Cotterell	2,530	2.4	+2.4
Democratic Labor	Peter Ferwerda	1,361	1.3	+1.3
Independent	Basil Smith	438	0.4	+0.4
Independent	Brian Lumsden	204	0.2	+0.2
Independent	Wilhelm Kapphan	75	0.1	+0.1
Total formal votes		103,634	98.1	+0.4
Informal votes		2,055	1.9	−0.4
Turnout		105,689		
Liberal	Rosemary Varty	52,086	50.3	
Labor	Bob Ives	40,818	39.4	
Democrats	Michael Nardella	4,947	4.8	
Call to Australia	William Watson	3,120	3.0	
Nuclear Disarmament	Jennifer Cotterell	2,649	2.6	
Liberal gain from Labor		Swing	N/A	

- A full distribution of preferences was not carried out, as Varty recorded a majority after the fifth count.

1985 Victorian state election: Nunawading Province
Party	Candidate	Votes	%	±%
Liberal	Rosemary Varty	50,584	46.1	
Labor	Bob Ives	50,220	45.8	
Democrats	Michael Nardella	8,855	8.1	
Total formal votes		109,659	97.7	
Informal votes		2,561	2.3	
Turnout		112,220	94.0	
Two-party-preferred result
Labor	Bob Ives	54,822*	50.0	−3.6
Liberal	Rosemary Varty	54,821	50.0	+3.6
Labor gain from Liberal		Swing	−3.6	

- Includes the casting vote by the returning officer.
- This result was overturned by the Court of Disputed Returns and a by-election was held.

1982 Victorian state election: Nunawading Province
Party	Candidate	Votes	%	±%
Liberal	Vernon Hauser	53,096	45.7	−4.1
Labor	Laurie McArthur	51,895	44.7	+5.8
Democrats	Jeffrey McAlpine	11,179	9.6	−1.7
Total formal votes		116,170	97.9	+0.3
Informal votes		2,506	2.1	−0.3
Turnout		118,676	94.9	+0.9
Two-party-preferred result
Labor	Laurie McArthur	58,461	50.3	+6.1
Liberal	Vernon Hauser	57,709	49.7	−6.1
Labor gain from Liberal		Swing	+6.1	

=== Elections in the 1970s ===
1979 Victorian state election: Nunawading Province
Party	Candidate	Votes	%	±%
Liberal	Peter Block	55,983	49.8	−10.4
Labor	Alan Wearne	43,709	38.9	−0.9
Democrats	Jeffrey McAlpine	12,644	11.3	+11.3
Total formal votes		112,336	97.6	0.0
Informal votes		2,706	2.4	0.0
Turnout		115,042	94.0	+0.4
Two-party-preferred result
Liberal	Peter Block	62,697	55.8	−4.4
Labor	Alan Wearne	49,639	44.2	+4.4
Liberal hold		Swing	−4.4	

1976 Victorian state election: Nunawading Province
Party	Candidate	Votes	%	±%
Liberal	Vernon Hauser	65,006	60.2	
Labor	John Madden	43,049	39.8	
Total formal votes		108,055	97.6	
Informal votes		2,612	2.4	
Turnout		110,667	93.6	
Liberal hold		Swing		
