= Electoral results for the Silvan Province =

Victoria, Australia, district election results

This is a list of electoral results for the Silvan Province in Victorian state elections.

== Members for Silvan Province ==
Member 1	Party	Year		
Rosemary Varty	Liberal	1992	Member 2	Party
Rosemary Varty	Liberal	1996	Wendy Smith	Liberal
Andrew Olexander	Liberal	1999	Wendy Smith	Liberal
Andrew Olexander	Liberal	2002	Carolyn Hirsh	Labor
Andrew Olexander	Independent	2005	Carolyn Hirsh	Independent

== Election results ==
=== Elections in the 2000s ===
2002 Victorian state election: Silvan Province
Party	Candidate	Votes	%	±%
Liberal	Wendy Smith	59,906	44.4	−8.4
Labor	Carolyn Hirsh	56,588	41.9	+3.5
Greens	Michael Abson	14,793	11.0	+10.7
Democrats	Tony Carden	2,333	1.7	−4.1
Hope	Leo Tischler	1,347	1.0	+1.0
Total formal votes		134,967	96.7	−0.4
Informal votes		4,549	3.3	+0.4
Turnout		139,516	93.5	
Two-party-preferred result
Labor	Carolyn Hirsh	69,885	51.8	+8.3
Liberal	Wendy Smith	65,082	48.2	−8.3
Labor gain from Liberal		Swing	+8.3	

=== Elections in the 1990s ===
1999 Victorian state election: Silvan Province
Party	Candidate	Votes	%	±%
Liberal	Andrew Olexander	66,992	53.1	−2.9
Labor	Mark Tunstall	48,266	38.2	+3.5
Democrats	Amanda Leeper	7,375	5.8	−0.1
Christian Democrats	Ray Levick	2,116	1.7	+1.7
Independent	Steve Raskovy	1,471	1.2	+0.4
Total formal votes		126,220	97.2	−0.6
Informal votes		3,685	2.8	+0.6
Turnout		129,905	93.9	
Two-party-preferred result
Liberal	Andrew Olexander	71,662	56.8	−3.6
Labor	Mark Tunstall	54,475	43.2	+3.6
Liberal hold		Swing	−3.6	

1996 Victorian state election: Silvan Province
Party	Candidate	Votes	%	±%
Liberal	Wendy Smith	68,604	56.0	−1.7
Labor	Kathy Jackson	42,540	34.7	−1.3
Democrats	John McLaren	7,318	6.0	+6.0
Natural Law	Sue Cawthorn	1,928	1.6	+1.6
Democratic Labor	Alan Jansen	1,143	0.9	−5.3
Independent	Steve Raskovy	952	0.8	+0.8
Total formal votes		122,485	97.8	+1.2
Informal votes		2,748	2.2	−1.2
Turnout		125,233	95.0	
Two-party-preferred result
Liberal	Wendy Smith	73,821	60.4	+0.4
Labor	Kathy Jackson	48,423	39.6	−0.4
Liberal hold		Swing	+0.4	

1992 Victorian state election: Silvan Province
Party	Candidate	Votes	%	±%
Liberal	Rosemary Varty	67,485	57.7	+8.4
Labor	Eugene O'Sullivan	42,139	36.1	−13.2
Democratic Labor	Paul McCarthy	7,251	6.2	+6.2
Total formal votes		116,875	96.6	−0.1
Informal votes		4,053	3.4	+0.1
Turnout		120,928	95.3	
Two-party-preferred result
Liberal	Rosemary Varty	70,087	60.0	+9.6
Labor	Eugene O'Sullivan	46,677	40.0	−9.6
Liberal hold		Swing	+9.6	
