= Electoral results for the district of Dromana =

Australian district election results

This is a list of electoral results for the Electoral district of Dromana in Victorian state elections.

== Members for Dromana ==
Member	Party	Term
Roberts Dunstan	Liberal	1967–1982
David Hassett	Labor	1982–1985
Dr Ron Wells	Liberal	1985–1992
Tony Hyams	Liberal	1992–1996
Martin Dixon	Liberal	1996–2002

== Election results ==
=== Elections in the 1990s ===
1999 Victorian state election: Dromana
Party	Candidate	Votes	%	±%
Liberal	Martin Dixon	17,900	54.4	+3.5
Labor	Diane Thompson	13,542	41.2	+7.0
Democratic Labor	Pat Crea	951	2.9	+2.9
Natural Law	Jan Charlwood	490	1.5	+0.6
Total formal votes		32,883	97.6	−0.8
Informal votes		799	2.4	+0.8
Turnout		33,682	93.5	−0.7
Two-party-preferred result
Liberal	Martin Dixon	18,480	56.2	−1.9
Labor	Diane Thompson	14,403	43.8	+1.9
Liberal hold		Swing	−1.9	

1996 Victorian state election: Dromana
Party	Candidate	Votes	%	±%
Liberal	Martin Dixon	16,032	51.0	−7.2
Labor	Ian Pugh	10,739	34.1	+0.1
Independent	Paul McGuinness	3,582	11.4	+11.4
Independent	Neale Adams	808	2.6	+2.6
Natural Law	Jan Charlwood	286	0.9	−0.9
Total formal votes		31,447	98.4	+1.4
Informal votes		510	1.6	−1.4
Turnout		31,957	94.2	−1.0
Two-party-preferred result
Liberal	Martin Dixon	18,229	58.1	−3.9
Labor	Ian Pugh	13,165	41.9	+3.9
Liberal hold		Swing	−3.9	

1992 Victorian state election: Dromana
Party	Candidate	Votes	%	±%
Liberal	Tony Hyams	17,487	58.2	+8.1
Labor	Kenneth Templar	10,222	34.0	−11.5
Natural Law	Irenee Orr	2,331	7.8	+7.8
Total formal votes		30,040	97.0	−0.4
Informal votes		936	3.0	+0.4
Turnout		30,976	95.2	
Two-party-preferred result
Liberal	Tony Hyams	18,587	62.0	+10.8
Labor	Kenneth Templar	11,409	38.0	−10.8
Liberal hold		Swing	+10.8	

=== Elections in the 1980s ===
1988 Victorian state election: Dromana
Party	Candidate	Votes	%	±%
Liberal	Ron Wells	15,857	50.81	−1.62
Labor	Robert Reilly	14,013	44.90	−2.67
Independent	Cecil Gill	799	2.56	+2.56
Independent	Florence Bubb	541	1.73	+1.73
Total formal votes		31,210	97.48	−0.79
Informal votes		807	2.52	+0.79
Turnout		32,017	93.09	−0.55
Two-party-preferred result
Liberal	Ron Wells	16,175	51.83	−0.60
Labor	Robert Reilly	15,032	48.17	+0.60
Liberal hold		Swing	−0.60	

1985 Victorian state election: Dromana
Party	Candidate	Votes	%	±%
Liberal	Ron Wells	14,523	52.4	+9.7
Labor	Allison Ogden	13,179	47.6	+3.0
Total formal votes		27,702	98.3	
Informal votes		487	1.7	
Turnout		28,189	93.6	
Liberal gain from Labor		Swing	+3.8	

1982 Victorian state election: Dromana
Party	Candidate	Votes	%	±%
Liberal	Ron Wells	13,977	43.5	−5.0
Labor	David Hassett	13,788	42.9	+4.9
Democrats	Maurice Freeman	1,860	5.8	−1.3
Independent	Ian Bendle	1,463	4.6	+4.6
Independent	Kenneth Payne	1,026	3.2	+3.2
Total formal votes		32,114	97.7	+0.1
Informal votes		743	2.3	−0.1
Turnout		32,857	92.5	+0.2
Two-party-preferred result
Labor	David Hassett	16,380	51.0	+7.7
Liberal	Ron Wells	15,734	49.0	−7.7
Labor gain from Liberal		Swing	+7.7	

=== Elections in the 1970s ===
1979 Victorian state election: Dromana
Party	Candidate	Votes	%	±%
Liberal	Roberts Dunstan	13,911	48.5	−11.1
Labor	David Hassett	10,878	38.0	+1.3
Democrats	Laurence Amor	2,043	7.1	+7.1
National	Kenneth Spunner	1,835	6.4	+6.4
Total formal votes		28,667	97.6	−0.8
Informal votes		708	2.4	+0.8
Turnout		29,375	92.3	+1.6
Two-party-preferred result
Liberal	Roberts Dunstan	16,254	56.7	−6.2
Labor	David Hassett	12,413	43.3	+6.2
Liberal hold		Swing	−6.2	

1976 Victorian state election: Dromana
Party	Candidate	Votes	%	±%
Liberal	Roberts Dunstan	14,895	59.6	+3.9
Labor	Geoffrey Eastwood	9,173	36.7	−0.2
Democratic Labor	John Cass	939	3.8	−1.2
Total formal votes		25,007	98.4	
Informal votes		415	1.6	
Turnout		25,422	90.7	
Two-party-preferred result
Liberal	Roberts Dunstan	15,740	62.9	+1.5
Labor	Geoffrey Eastwood	9,267	37.1	−1.5
Liberal hold		Swing	+1.5	

1973 Victorian state election: Dromana
Party	Candidate	Votes	%	±%
Liberal	Roberts Dunstan	14,666	54.8	+0.3
Labor	Jim Snow	10,144	37.9	+3.6
Democratic Labor	Elizabeth Barton	1,943	7.3	−3.9
Total formal votes		26,753	97.9	+0.1
Informal votes		583	2.1	−0.1
Turnout		27,336	92.4	−1.5
Two-party-preferred result
Liberal	Roberts Dunstan	16,318	61.0	−3.9
Labor	Jim Snow	10,435	39.0	+3.9
Liberal hold		Swing	−3.9	

1970 Victorian state election: Dromana
Party	Candidate	Votes	%	±%
Liberal	Roberts Dunstan	11,520	54.5	−0.8
Labor	Neil McIntosh	7,239	34.3	+4.7
Democratic Labor	Josephus Gobel	2,369	11.2	+1.7
Total formal votes		21,128	97.8	−0.1
Informal votes		484	2.2	+0.1
Turnout		21,612	93.9	−0.2
Two-party-preferred result
Liberal	Roberts Dunstan	13,534	64.1	−4.3
Labor	Neil McIntosh	7,594	35.9	+4.3
Liberal hold		Swing	−4.3	

=== Elections in the 1960s ===
1967 Victorian state election: Dromana
Party	Candidate	Votes	%	±%
Liberal	Roberts Dunstan	9,949	55.3	−3.1
Labor	Barrie Rimmer	5,330	29.6	+1.9
Democratic Labor	Michael Kearney	1,710	9.5	−4.3
Country	William Weston	1,003	5.6	+5.6
Total formal votes		17,992	97.9	
Informal votes		376	2.1	
Turnout		18,368	94.1	
Two-party-preferred result
Liberal	Roberts Dunstan	12,306	68.4	−1.8
Labor	Barrie Rimmer	5,686	31.6	+1.8
Liberal hold		Swing	−1.8	
