= Electoral results for the Eumemmerring Province =

Victoria, Australia, district election results

This is a list of electoral results for the Eumemmerring Province in Victorian state elections.

== Members for Eumemmerring Province ==
Member 1	Party	Year		
Fred Van Buren	Labor	1985	Member 2	Party
Fred Van Buren	Labor	1988	Bob Ives	Labor
Ron Wells	Liberal	1992	Bob Ives	Labor
Ron Wells	Liberal	1996	Neil Lucas	Liberal
Gordon Rich-Phillips	Liberal	1999	Neil Lucas	Liberal
Gordon Rich-Phillips	Liberal	2002	Adem Somyurek	Labor

== Election results ==
=== Elections in the 2000s ===
2002 Victorian state election: Eumemmerring Province
Party	Candidate	Votes	%	±%
Labor	Adem Somyurek	67,534	52.9	+8.4
Liberal	Mick Morland	46,120	36.1	−10.1
Greens	Val Kay	14,059	11.0	+11.0
Total formal votes		127,713	95.8	−0.1
Informal votes		5,546	4.2	+0.1
Turnout		133,259	93.4	
Two-party-preferred result
Labor	Adem Somyurek	76,438	59.9	+10.5
Liberal	Mick Morland	51,230	40.1	−10.5
Labor gain from Liberal		Swing	+10.5	

=== Elections in the 1990s ===
1999 Victorian state election: Eumemmerring Province
Party	Candidate	Votes	%	±%
Liberal	Gordon Rich-Phillips	65,426	45.4	−3.4
Labor	Carlos Baldovino	64,024	44.4	+1.4
Democrats	Daniel Berk	5,161	3.6	−0.5
Independent	Roz Blades	5,017	3.5	+3.5
Christian Democrats	Lynne Dickson	4,492	3.1	+0.6
Total formal votes		144,120	95.8	−1.0
Informal votes		6,243	4.2	+1.0
Turnout		150,363	94.3	
Two-party-preferred result
Liberal	Gordon Rich-Phillips	72,518	50.3	−2.5
Labor	Carlos Baldovino	71,602	49.7	+2.5
Liberal hold		Swing	−2.5	

1996 Victorian state election: Eumemmerring Province
Party	Candidate	Votes	%	±%
Liberal	Neil Lucas	64,976	48.8	−3.8
Labor	Bob Ives	57,243	43.0	+1.8
Democrats	John Hastie	5,478	4.1	+4.1
Call to Australia	Lynne Dickson	3,413	2.6	+2.6
Democratic Labor	Teresa Crea	2,056	1.5	−4.6
Total formal votes		133,166	96.9	+2.0
Informal votes		4,273	3.1	−2.0
Turnout		137,439	94.9	
Two-party-preferred result
Liberal	Neil Lucas	70,196	52.8	−2.3
Labor	Bob Ives	62,780	47.2	+2.3
Liberal gain from Labor		Swing	−2.3	

1992 Victorian state election: Eumemmerring Province
Party	Candidate	Votes	%	±%
Liberal	Ron Wells	60,726	52.6	+6.0
Labor	Fred Van Buren	47,554	41.2	−11.9
Democratic Labor	Timothy Dodd	7,115	6.2	+6.2
Total formal votes		115,395	94.9	+0.6
Informal votes		6,237	5.1	−0.6
Turnout		121,632	95.2	
Two-party-preferred result
Liberal	Ron Wells	63,396	55.1	+8.3
Labor	Fred Van Buren	51,745	44.9	−8.3
Liberal gain from Labor		Swing	+8.3	

=== Elections in the 1980s ===
1988 Victorian state election: Eumemmerring Province
Party	Candidate	Votes	%	±%
Labor	Bob Ives	62,602	56.5	−3.3
Liberal	Janice Bateman	48,166	43.5	+3.3
Total formal votes		110,768	92.9	−2.5
Informal votes		8,449	7.1	+2.5
Turnout		119,217	92.2	−1.3
Labor hold		Swing	−3.3	

1985 Victorian state election: Eumemmerring Province
Party	Candidate	Votes	%	±%
Labor	Fred Van Buren	62,352	59.8	
Liberal	John Ferwerda	41,846	40.2	
Total formal votes		104,198	95.4	
Informal votes		5,042	4.6	
Turnout		109,240	93.5	
Labor hold		Swing	+0.9	
