= Electoral results for the district of Mitcham (Victoria) =

Victoria, Australia, district election results

This is a list of electoral results for the Electoral district of Mitcham in Victorian state elections.

== Members for Mitcham ==
Member	Party	Term
Dorothy Goble	Liberal	1967–1976
George Cox	Liberal	1976–1982
John Harrowfield	Labor	1982–1992
Roger Pescott	Liberal	1992–1997
Tony Robinson	Labor	1997–2010
Dee Ryall	Liberal	2010–2014

== Election results ==
=== Elections in the 2010s ===
2010 Victorian state election: Mitcham
Party	Candidate	Votes	%	±%
Liberal	Dee Ryall	15,717	46.55	+7.09
Labor	Tony Robinson	11,669	34.56	−5.56
Greens	Sheridan Lewis	4,024	11.92	+0.33
Sex Party	Paul Elliott	963	2.85	+2.85
Family First	Daniel Ha	758	2.25	−2.28
Democratic Labor	Barry O'Shea	632	1.87	+1.87
Total formal votes		33,763	96.55	+0.06
Informal votes		1,208	3.45	−0.06
Turnout		34,971	94.38	−0.10
Two-party-preferred result
Liberal	Dee Ryall	17,852	52.90	+4.77
Labor	Tony Robinson	15,895	47.10	−4.77
Liberal gain from Labor		Swing	+4.77	

=== Elections in the 2000s ===
2006 Victorian state election: Mitcham
Party	Candidate	Votes	%	±%
Labor	Tony Robinson	13,305	40.1	−7.7
Liberal	Philip Daw	13,085	39.5	+1.6
Greens	Rob Redman	3,843	11.6	+1.0
Family First	Miriam Rawson	1,501	4.5	+4.5
Independent	Peter Allan	936	2.8	+2.8
People Power	Sharon Partridge	490	1.5	+1.5
Total formal votes		33,160	96.5	−0.9
Informal votes		1,205	3.5	+0.9
Turnout		34,365	94.5	
Two-party-preferred result
Labor	Tony Robinson	17,234	52.0	−5.7
Liberal	Philip Daw	15,926	48.0	+5.7
Labor hold		Swing	−5.7	

2002 Victorian state election: Mitcham
Party	Candidate	Votes	%	±%
Labor	Tony Robinson	16,097	47.8	+3.0
Liberal	Russell Hannan	12,735	37.9	−9.9
Greens	Bill Pemberton	3,559	10.6	+10.6
Independent	Kaele Way	946	2.8	+2.8
Independent	Liz Turner	307	0.9	+0.9
Total formal votes		33,644	97.4	−0.4
Informal votes		906	2.6	+0.4
Turnout		34,550	94.2	
Two-party-preferred result
Labor	Tony Robinson	19,405	57.7	+7.7
Liberal	Russell Hannan	14,239	42.3	−7.7
Labor hold		Swing	+7.7	

=== Elections in the 1990s ===
1999 Victorian state election: Mitcham
Party	Candidate	Votes	%	±%
Liberal	Andrew Munroe	15,043	47.2	−6.4
Labor	Tony Robinson	14,411	45.2	+4.7
Independent	Chris Aubrey	1,529	4.8	+4.8
Hope	Tim Petherbridge	894	2.8	+2.8
Total formal votes		31,877	97.8	−0.3
Informal votes		729	2.2	+0.3
Turnout		32,606	94.6	
Two-party-preferred result
Labor	Tony Robinson	16,110	50.5	+5.8
Liberal	Andrew Munroe	15,767	49.5	−5.8
Labor gain from Liberal		Swing	+5.8	

1997 Mitcham state by-election
Party	Candidate	Votes	%	±%
Labor	Tony Robinson	13,206	46.3	+5.8
Liberal	Andrew Munroe	8,764	30.7	−22.9
Democrats	John McLaren	1,857	6.5	+6.5
Independent	Peter Stokes	1,356	4.7	+4.7
Greens	Robyn Evans	1,021	3.6	+3.6
Independent	Tim Petherbridge	551	1.9	+1.9
Independent	Rob Wootton	498	1.7	+1.7
Independent	Adam Kliska	257	0.9	+0.9
Shooters	David McDermott	245	0.9	+0.9
Reform	Mike Dunn	204	0.7	+0.7
Independent	Steve Raskovy	88	0.3	+0.3
Abolish Child Support	Abolish Child Support	69	0.2	+0.2
Independent	Adrian Stagg	55	0.2	+0.2
Independent	Basil Smith	48	0.2	+0.2
Independent	Neville Ford	42	0.1	+0.1
Independent	Shalam Kalinkara	42	0.1	+0.1
Total formal votes		28,549	96.5	−1.6
Informal votes		1,040	3.5	+1.6
Turnout		29,589	87.2	
Two-party-preferred result
Labor	Tony Robinson	17,214	60.5	+15.8
Liberal	Andrew Munroe	11,247	39.5	−15.8
Labor gain from Liberal		Swing	+15.8	

1996 Victorian state election: Mitcham
Party	Candidate	Votes	%	±%
Liberal	Roger Pescott	16,951	53.6	−0.8
Labor	Julie Warren	12,791	40.5	+3.1
Independent	Howard Tankey	1,539	4.9	+4.9
Natural Law	Andrew Stenberg	333	1.1	+1.1
Total formal votes		31,614	98.1	+1.1
Informal votes		620	1.9	−1.1
Turnout		32,234	95.2	
Two-party-preferred result
Liberal	Roger Pescott	17,446	55.3	−3.2
Labor	Julie Warren	14,088	44.7	+3.2
Liberal hold		Swing	−3.2	

1992 Victorian state election: Mitcham
Party	Candidate	Votes	%	±%
Liberal	Roger Pescott	16,735	54.4	+11.6
Labor	John Harrowfield	11,504	37.4	−8.9
Independent	Gilbert Boffa	2,516	8.2	+8.2
Total formal votes		30,755	97.0	−0.2
Informal votes		962	3.0	+0.2
Turnout		31,717	95.8	
Two-party-preferred result
Liberal	Roger Pescott	17,966	58.5	+10.8
Labor	John Harrowfield	12,726	41.5	−10.8
Liberal gain from Labor		Swing	+10.8	

=== Elections in the 1980s ===
1988 Victorian state election: Mitcham
Party	Candidate	Votes	%	±%
Labor	John Harrowfield	12,380	45.98	−7.73
Liberal	Matthew Starr	11,548	42.89	−3.40
Democrats	Louise Enders	1,830	6.80	+6.80
Call to Australia	Johan Elsmann	1,164	4.32	+4.32
Total formal votes		26,922	97.10	−0.42
Informal votes		805	2.90	+0.42
Turnout		27,727	93.72	−0.71
Two-party-preferred result
Labor	John Harrowfield	14,247	52.95	−0.76
Liberal	Matthew Starr	12,661	47.05	+0.76
Labor hold		Swing	−0.76	

1985 Victorian state election: Mitcham
Party	Candidate	Votes	%	±%
Labor	John Harrowfield	14,928	53.7	+4.9
Liberal	Bruce Camfield	12,868	46.3	+5.6
Total formal votes		27,796	97.5	
Informal votes		708	2.5	
Turnout		28,504	94.4	
Labor hold		Swing	+0.1	

1982 Victorian state election: Mitcham
Party	Candidate	Votes	%	±%
Labor	John Harrowfield	13,581	50.0	+5.7
Liberal	George Cox	11,075	40.8	−3.5
Democrats	Ross Roberts	1,702	6.3	−2.1
Democratic Labor	Ada Kowal	785	2.9	+2.9
Total formal votes		27,143	97.9	+0.1
Informal votes		573	2.1	−0.1
Turnout		27,716	95.3	+0.8
Two-party-preferred result
Labor	John Harrowfield	14,638	53.9	+4.6
Liberal	George Cox	12,505	46.1	−4.6
Labor gain from Liberal		Swing	+4.6	

=== Elections in the 1970s ===
1979 Victorian state election: Mitcham
Party	Candidate	Votes	%	±%
Liberal	George Cox	11,807	44.3	−11.2
Labor	Michael Shatin	11,799	44.3	−0.2
Democrats	Frank Andrewartha	2,227	8.4	+8.4
Australia	Peter Allan	801	3.0	+3.0
Total formal votes		26,634	97.8	+0.4
Informal votes		607	2.2	−0.4
Turnout		27,241	94.5	+0.9
Two-party-preferred result
Liberal	George Cox	13,512	50.7	−4.8
Labor	Michael Shatin	13,122	49.3	+4.8
Liberal hold		Swing	−4.8	

1976 Victorian state election: Mitcham
Party	Candidate	Votes	%	±%
Liberal	George Cox	14,294	55.5	+9.7
Labor	Gordon Henderson	11,444	44.5	+2.4
Total formal votes		25,738	97.4	
Informal votes		693	2.6	
Turnout		26,431	93.6	
Liberal hold		Swing	+1.7	

1973 Victorian state election: Mitcham
Party	Candidate	Votes	%	±%
Liberal	Dorothy Goble	14,278	47.3	+7.7
Labor	John Hyslop	12,156	40.3	−1.0
Democratic Labor	Marianne Crowe	1,637	5.4	−6.8
Australia	Ethel Beaumont	1,619	5.4	+5.4
Defence of Government Schools	Ray Nilsen	503	1.7	−5.2
Total formal votes		30,193	97.8	+0.6
Informal votes		692	2.2	−0.6
Turnout		30,885	93.3	−1.5
Two-party-preferred result
Liberal	Dorothy Goble	16,661	55.2	+2.9
Labor	John Hyslop	13,532	44.8	−2.9
Liberal hold		Swing	+2.9	

1970 Victorian state election: Mitcham
Party	Candidate	Votes	%	±%
Labor	John Hyslop	11,146	41.3	+0.1
Liberal	Dorothy Goble	10,693	39.6	−6.2
Democratic Labor	Marianne Crowe	3,294	12.2	−0.8
Defence of Government Schools	Ray Nilsen	1,870	6.9	+6.9
Total formal votes		27,003	97.2	−0.7
Informal votes		774	2.8	+0.7
Turnout		27,777	94.8	−0.4
Two-party-preferred result
Liberal	Dorothy Goble	14,122	52.3	−4.7
Labor	John Hyslop	12,881	47.7	+4.7
Liberal hold		Swing	−4.7	

=== Elections in the 1960s ===
1967 Victorian state election: Mitcham
Party	Candidate	Votes	%	±%
Liberal	Dorothy Goble	11,329	45.7	−4.2
Labor	Graham Walsh	10,203	41.2	+5.8
Democratic Labor	Gerald Shinnick	3,231	13.1	−1.6
Total formal votes		24,763	97.9	
Informal votes		534	2.1	
Turnout		25,297	95.2	
Two-party-preferred result
Liberal	Dorothy Goble	14,116	57.0	−5.5
Labor	Graham Walsh	10,647	43.0	+5.5
Liberal hold		Swing	−5.5	
