= Ian Cover =

Australian politician (born 1956)

Ian James Cover (born 31 July 1956) is an Australian radio presenter, comedian, politician and author. He rose to prominence as a founding member of radio sporting comedy group the Coodabeen Champions, entered Victorian state politics in 1996, serving one term as a Liberal Party member of the Victorian Legislative Council, and subsequently returned to radio comedy. Cover has also been a radio presenter and newspaper columnist in his own right, and has written three books.

Cover was born in Melbourne, and was educated at Bellaire Primary School and Belmont High School in Geelong. He initially worked as a journalist for the Geelong Advertiser from 1976 until 1981, when he went into radio comedy. He was a founding member of the Coodabeen Champions, and was part of their Coodabeens Footy Show across three different radio stations: 3RRR, 3AW, and 774 ABC Melbourne. Outside his work with the Coodabeen Champions, he briefly worked as a personal assistant to Liberal MLC Glyn Jenkins in 1982, worked as a journalist for the Herald and Weekly Times from 1982 to 1986, and was a radio announcer with 3UZ from 1987 to 1989.

Cover joined the Liberal Party in 1995, and was subsequently preselected as the Liberal candidate for the open seat of Geelong Province for the 1996 election, after being approached by Premier Jeff Kennett. He was endorsed by the party's administrative committee over the top of the local party branch, causing some consternation, but nonetheless went on to win the seat. He was appointed secretary of the parliamentary Liberal Party after the party lost government at the 1999 election, and was promoted into the shadow ministry in July 2000 as Shadow Minister for Sport and Recreation, Shadow Minister for Racing and Shadow Minister for Youth Affairs. He was rumoured as a likely candidate for the Legislative Assembly seat of Bellarine at the 2002 election, but instead recontested and lost his Legislative Council seat in the Liberal Party's landslide loss that year. He subsequently returned to radio comedy.

A property Cover and his family had owned for thirty years was destroyed in the Dereel bushfires of March 2013.

Cover has a daughter called Coco.

== Books ==
- The Coodabeen Champions Big Bumper Footy Book (1990)
- The Coodabeen Champions Take a Good Hard Look at Australia (1992)
- Merv and Me - On Tour (1993)

Victorian Legislative Council
Preceded by David Henshaw	Member for Geelong Province; 1988–2002; With: Bill Hartigan, Elaine Carbines	Succeeded by John Eren
