= Electoral results for the district of Noble Park =

Victoria, Australia, district election results

This is a list of electoral results for the electoral district of Noble Park in Victorian state elections.

== Members for Noble Park ==
Member	Party	Term
Peter Collins	Liberal	1976–1982
Terry Norris	Labor	1982–1985

== Election results ==
=== Elections in the 1980s ===
1982 Victorian state election: Noble Park
Party	Candidate	Votes	%	±%
Labor	Terry Norris	17,833	53.3	+4.3
Liberal	Peter Collins	14,017	41.9	−9.1
Democrats	Geoffrey Earl	1,581	4.7	+4.7
Total formal votes		33,431	97.0	+1.1
Informal votes		1,025	3.0	−1.1
Turnout		34,456	94.9	+0.5
Two-party-preferred result
Labor	Terry Norris	18,742	56.1	+7.1
Liberal	Peter Collins	14,689	43.9	−7.1
Labor gain from Liberal		Swing	+7.1	

=== Elections in the 1970s ===
1979 Victorian state election: Noble Park
Party	Candidate	Votes	%	±%
Liberal	Peter Collins	14,947	51.0	−5.1
Labor	Tony Van Vliet	14,352	49.0	+5.1
Total formal votes		29,299	95.9	−1.1
Informal votes		1,259	4.1	+1.1
Turnout		30,558	94.4	+0.9
Liberal hold		Swing	−5.1	

1976 Victorian state election: Noble Park
Party	Candidate	Votes	%	±%
Liberal	Peter Collins	15,462	56.1	+9.0
Labor	Tony Van Vliet	12,086	43.9	−2.5
Total formal votes		28,404	97.0	
Informal votes		856	3.0	
Turnout		28,404	93.5	
Liberal hold		Swing	+3.2	
