= Electoral district of Mitcham =

Electoral district of Mitcham may refer to:

- Electoral district of Mitcham (South Australia)
- Electoral district of Mitcham (Victoria)
