= Don Saltmarsh =

Australian politician

Donald Neville Saltmarsh (6 April 1934 – 3 November 2006) was an Australian politician.

He was born at Rutherglen to schoolteacher Maxwell Ronald Saltmarsh and Winifred Jeanie Shore. He was educated at Warragul, and received a Diploma of Agriculture from Longerong Agricultural College in 1954 before studying at Melbourne University, where he received a Bachelor of Arts in 1959. From 1959 he was a Methodist minister, first at Williamstown, then at Lindisfarne in Tasmania (1960–64), Fitzroy (1965–69) and the Wesley Central Mission in Melbourne (1970–71). On 14 March 1959 he married Ariel Alder Keen, with whom he had four children. He had joined the Labor Party in 1967, but in 1971 moved to the Liberal Party. In 1976 he was elected to the Victorian Legislative Council for Waverley. He resigned from the Council in 1982 to successfully contest the Legislative Assembly seat of Wantirna, but he was defeated in 1985. Saltmarsh died in 2006.

Victorian Legislative Council
New seat	Member for Waverley; 1976–1982; Served alongside: none; Cyril Kennedy	Succeeded by Tony Van Vliet
Victorian Legislative Assembly
Preceded by Geoff Hayes	Member for Wantirna; 1982–1985	Succeeded by Carolyn Hirsh
