= Wendy Smith (politician) =

Australian politician

Member of the Victorian Legislative Council for Silvan Province
- In office 30 March 1996 – 29 November 2002 Serving with Rosemary Varty (1996–1999); Andrew Olexander (1999–2002)
- Succeeded by: Carolyn Hirsh

Personal details
- Party: Liberal Party
- Education: Melbourne University

Wendy Smith is the chairman and executive director of Vipac Engineers and Scientists Ltd and deputy chairman of the Victorian Government's Patient Review Panel.

She has a Bachelor of Arts from the University of Melbourne and a general nursing certificate from Adelaide Children's Hospital.

== Career ==
Her former corporate government positions include deputy chairman of the Tourism Victoria Board, chairman of the Audit and Risk Committee of the Tourism Victoria Board, director of the Victorian Public Transport Ombudsman Board and chairman of the Audit and Risk Committee of the Public Transport Ombudsman Board. She was a City of Kew councillor from 1983 to 1988.

Her background in politics includes six years (1996–2002) as a Victorian Member of Parliament for the Silvan Electorate. Smith was the Shadow Minister for Small Business in 2002 and Shadow Cabinet Secretary from 2000 to 2002. She was also a ministerial advisor to the Kennett Victorian Government in the Major Projects portfolio from 1993 to 1996.

From 2003 to 2014, she was the owner and operator of an ecological tourism business and involved in Australian tourism and trade both internationally and nationally.

== Founder ==
Smith was the founder and principal of International Infrastructure conferences based in Singapore from 1989 to 1993. From 1988 to 1989, she was the general manager of the Metropolitan Municipal Association (MMA).

Her earlier professions include being a nurse educator at the Royal Children's Hospital, Brisbane, and health counsellor at La Trobe University in Victoria.
