= David Hassett =

Australian politician

David Lindsay Hassett (born 3 December 1947) is an Australian politician.

He was born in Frankston to cabinet maker Edward John Hassett and Daphne Marie Hailwood. After attending local state schools, he became an officer with the Commonwealth Bank in 1966. On 10 December 1968, he married Denise Lesley Smith, with whom he had two children. They divorced in 2004, and Hassett married Vera Elizabeth Jones on 14 July 2005.

Hassett was treasurer of the Labor Party's Flinders federal electorate assembly in 1977, and served as secretary of the Mornington party branch from 1978 to 1979. In 1982, he was elected to the Victorian Legislative Assembly as the Labor member for Dromana, but was defeated in 1985. He then attended Monash University, where he received a Diploma of Education-Primary in 1987, and Deakin University, where he qualified as a mathematics and computing teacher in 1992. From 1992 to 1996, he worked as project coordinator of SkillShare in the City of Springvale. From 1997 to 1998, he was an English teacher at Nova International School in Japan and, since 1999, he has worked as a teacher, mainly in special education. From 1998 to 2000, he was again secretary of the Mornington Labor Party branch, having been its president from 1992 to 1997.

Victorian Legislative Assembly
Preceded by Roberts Dunstan	Member for Dromana; 1982–1985	Succeeded by Ron Wells
