= 1985 Nunawading Province state by-election =

- 17 August 1985

Province of Nunawading in the Victorian Legislative Council

	First party	Second party
Candidate	Rosemary Varty	Bob Ives
Party	Liberal	Labor
Primary vote	51,006	40,578
Percentage	49.2%	39.2%
Swing	▲3.1	▼6.6
MLC before election
Vacant (Note: Although Bob Ives had won the seat at the 1985 state election following the casting vote by the returning officer, this result had been overturned by the Court of Disputed Returns and the seat was vacant prior to the by-election.)
Elected MLC
Rosemary Varty
Liberal

The 1985 Nunawading Province by-election was held on 17 August 1985 to elect the member for Nunawading Province in the Victorian Legislative Council. It was ordered by the Court of Disputed Returns after the 1985 Victorian state election had resulted in a tie between the top two candidates, and the Chief Electoral Officer drew a name at random. The Chief Electoral Officer drew the name of the ALP candidate Bob Ives. After the Court ordered a new election, the outcome was that the Liberal candidate Rosemary Varty was returned.

== Background ==
In 1985, the Legislative Council consisted of 44 members. They were elected for 8-year terms from 22 two-member provinces. Half of the Council retired every four years, so each election elected one member in each province. The Nunawading Province consisted of the Victorian Legislative Assembly seats of Box Hill, Mitcham, Ringwood and Warrandyte. Lawrence Alexander McArthur was the continuing member for Nunawading Province.

In the 1985 general election held on 2 March 1985, the vote ended with a dead heat after distribution of preferences from the Australian Democrats candidate. The Labor candidate Bob Ives and the Liberal candidate Rosemary Varty received 54,821 votes each. The returning officer, Kathleen Leonard, was required by law to make a casting vote, which she did by drawing a name from a ballot box. The name drawn was Bob Ives and he was declared elected. The Age described the result as "the most sensational electoral finish in memory". Electing Ives to the Legislative Council would give the ALP control of the house, however the Court of Disputed Returns voided the result before he could take his seat.

Varty disputed the result in the Court of Disputed Returns. The court (Mr Justice Starke) found that there had been errors and omissions made by electoral officers, and these had not been found not to affect the result (i.e., they could have affected the outcome), and declared the election absolutely void on 25 July 1985. Forty-four votes had been incorrectly excluded from the count.

The court ordered a by-election which was won convincingly by Liberal candidate Rosemary Varty.

== Controversy ==
On the day of the by-election, the Nuclear Disarmament Party how-to-vote cards only showed a 1 in the box for their candidate, and encouraged voters to allocate their own preferences. Members of the Labor Party were accused of orchestrating that there were other "How to vote for Nuclear Disarmament" flyers distributed that showed a full set of preferences, with NDP first and Labor 2nd.

== Results ==
1985 Nunawading Province state by-election
Party	Candidate	Votes	%	±%
Liberal	Rosemary Varty	51,006	49.2	+3.1
Labor	Bob Ives	40,578	39.2	−6.6
Democrats	Michael Nardella	4,760	4.6	−3.5
Call to Australia	William Watson	2,682	2.6	+2.6
Nuclear Disarmament	Jennifer Cotterell	2,530	2.4	+2.4
Democratic Labor	Peter Ferwerda	1,361	1.3	+1.3
Independent	Basil Smith	438	0.4	+0.4
Independent	Brian Lumsden	204	0.2	+0.2
Independent	Wilhelm Kapphan	75	0.1	+0.1
Total formal votes		103,634	98.1	+0.4
Informal votes		2,055	1.9	−0.4
Turnout		105,689		
After distribution of preferences
Liberal	Rosemary Varty	52,086	50.3	
Labor	Bob Ives	40,818	39.4	
Democrats	Michael Nardella	4,947	4.8	
Call to Australia	William Watson	3,120	3.0	
Nuclear Disarmament	Jennifer Cotterell	2,649	2.6	
Liberal gain from Labor		Swing	N/A	

- A full distribution of preferences was not carried out, as Varty recorded a majority after the fifth count.
