= Electoral district of Dromana =

Former state electoral district of Victoria, Australia

Dromana Victoria—Legislative Assembly
- State: Victoria
- Created: 1967
- Abolished: 2002
- Namesake: Dromana, Victoria
- Demographic: Rural
- Coordinates: 38°20′S 144°58′E

Electoral district of Dromana was an electoral district of the Legislative Assembly in the Australian state of Victoria from 1967 to 2002.

== Members for Dromana ==
Member	Party	Term
Roberts Dunstan	Liberal	1967–1982
David Hassett	Labor	1982–1985
Dr Ron Wells	Liberal	1985–1992
Tony Hyams	Liberal	1992–1996
Martin Dixon	Liberal	1996–2002
