= Australian Payments Council =

Trade association

- Type: Industry body
- Industry: Payments
- Founded: August 2014; 11 years ago
- Defunct: February 2022
- Fate: Dissolved
- Headquarters: Sydney, Australia
- Key people: Robert Milliner, Chair
- Parent: Reserve Bank of Australia
- Website: australianpaymentscouncil.com.au

The Australian Payments Council is the strategic coordination body for the payments industry. It promotes industry collaboration and engages directly with the Reserve Bank of Australia’s Payments System Board (PSB).

The Payments Council also encourages and facilitates strategic alignment between the payments industry and the Payments System Board on significant payments issues and initiatives.

The Council has an independent non-executive chairman and 13 members each drawn from a broad community of payments organisations that include financial institutions, card schemes, major retailers and other payment service providers as well as the Australian Payments Clearing Association (APCA) and the Reserve Bank of Australia (RBA). Robert Milliner acts as the independent non-executive chairman of the Council.

== Objectives ==
The Australian Payments Council works collaboratively with the industry to ensure the Australian payments system continues to meet the changing needs of Australian businesses and consumers. The Australian Payments Council’s achieves this by:

- Driving the strategic agenda for the Australian payments system
- Engaging with the Payments System Board on setting and achieving strategic objectives
- Identifying strategic issues and emerging trends
- Generating common industry positions for adoption by the industry
- Identifying and removing any barriers to innovation through collaboration

== History ==
In October 2013, the Australian Payments Clearing Association (APCA) and the Reserve Bank of Australia (RBA) launched a joint consultation on establishing a new payments industry coordination body. Over 15 industry submissions were received in November 2013 to help shape the structure and governance of the council.

The Australian Payments Council was established in August 2014. The initial member organisations drawn from the wider Payments Community to form the Payments Council were: ANZ, APCA, Commonwealth Bank, Cuscal, eftpos Payments, First Data, National Australia Bank, PayPal, RBA, Suncorp-Metway, Visa, Westpac and the Woolworths conglomerate.

The Australian Payments Council held a hackathon in August 2017 to examine how greater access to data could improve the lives of Australians.

The Australian Payments Council met for the final time on 28 February 2022. The decision to discontinue its role as the strategic coordination body for the Australian payments recognised that arrangements announced by the Government in response to the Review of the Australian Payments System will largely supersede the role of the APC.
