= John Harrowfield =

Australian politician

John Dyson Harrowfield (19 February 1953 – 1 July 2026) was an Australian politician.

Harrowfield was born in Melbourne to Roy Wilmott Harrowfield and Irene Mary Whitworth. He attended state schools and then Melbourne University, where he received a Bachelor of Commerce. He worked as an accountant and as an economics tutor at Melbourne University, and the Swinburne and Chisholm Institutes of Technology. A member of the Labor Party, he was president of the Blackburn North branch from 1974 to 1979.

At the 1982 state election, Harrowfield was elected to the Victorian Legislative Assembly as the member for Mitcham. He was promoted to the front bench as Minister for Small Business on 16 April 1991, a position he held until 21 January 1992 when he became Minister for Finance. Harrowfield lost his seat in the 1992 state election. After leaving parliament, he became a public policy researcher and consultant.

Horrowfield died on 1 July 2026.

Victorian Legislative Assembly
Preceded by George Cox	Member for Mitcham; 1982–1992	Succeeded by Roger Pescott
