= Brian Mier =

Australian politician

Brian William Mier (21 February 1935 – 12 September 2009) was an Australian politician.

He was born in Footscray in Melbourne to Edward Alexander Mier, a dispatch clerk, and Elsie Elizabeth, née Hunter. He attended local state schools and became an apprentice plumber in 1949. He underwent national service from 1954 to 1956, after which he joined the Labor Party and became an organiser with the Plumbers and Gasfitters Employees Union (PGEU). In 1960 he was secretary of the ALP's Footscray-Seddon branch, and he served as assistant secretary of the PGEU from 1970 to 1975. In 1975 he became a full-time organiser with the Labor Party, serving as acting state secretary in 1981 and secretary of the national industrial relations committee from 1980 to 1982. In 1982 he was elected to the Victorian Legislative Council in a by-election for the seat of Waverley Province.

Mier served on numerous committees following his election, and in 1990 was appointed Minister for Prices, Aboriginal Affairs and Consumer Affairs. Less than a year later he stood down from the position, and he retired from politics in 1996. Mier died in 2009 in Melbourne.

Victorian Legislative Council
Preceded by Tony Van Vliet	Member for Waverley Province; 1982–1996; Served alongside: Cyril Kennedy; Andrew Brideson	Succeeded by Maree Luckins
