= Tony Hyams =

Australian politician

Anthony J. "Tony" Hyams AM (born 2 November 1945) has spent most of his career in banking, finance, and investment. Since 1996 he has been a professional non-executive company director.

== Early life ==
Tony Hyams was born in Melbourne, Victoria on 2 November 1945 to David Victor Hyams and Maidie Eunice Hyams (née Flint). He began his education at Toorak Central School (1952–53) and Vermont State School before moving to Melbourne Grammar School in 1955; He graduated in 1963. He then completed a double degree in Bachelor of Laws and Bachelor of Commerce at the University of Melbourne, graduating in 1969.

== Financial career ==
After university in 1970, Hyams worked with the Melbourne firm Phillips, Fox and Masel. In 1971 he joined the Swiss Financial Services group Credit Suisse in Zurich. On returning to Melbourne he joined the Swiss group of companies legal, leading Credit Suisse in Australia until 1992. In that period he was seconded part-time to Edward Keller Trading Company as an executive director and to the Switzerland Insurance Group as the investment manager and later senior adviser.

Hyams has been a director of various companies, including:

- The Australian Infrastructure Fund (Chairman Audit Committee)
- Melbourne Airport (Chairman Safety, Security and Environment Committee)
- Blue Star Print Group NZ
- Australian Maritime Safety Authority (Deputy Chairman)
- Australian Government Employees Superannuation Fund (Chairman Investment Committee)
- The Military Superannuation Fund (Chairman)
- Aria - the Superannuation Fund for Commonwealth Government Civilian Employees (Chairman)
- The Commonwealth Government Superannuation Corporation (Chairman)

Hyams is a member of:

- the Law Institute of Victoria
- various sporting and social clubs
- the Australian Institute of Company Directors

Hyams has been a participant in the World Economic Forum, participating on the Long Term Investment Council, the Role of Business Council, and at annual meetings in Davos.

== Politics ==
Hyams became a member of the Liberal Party in 1975. Hyams was named as the Liberal candidate for the southern Mornington Peninsula seat of Dromana for the 1992 Victorian state election after the sitting member Dr. Ron Wells lost the party endorsement. He won the seat with 62% TPP. He served in the Kennett government and on Public Accounts and Estimates Committee. He announced that he would not be running again and his term came to an end on the day of the 1996 election. He was succeeded by Martin Dixon.

== Honours ==
On 11 June 2012, Hyams was named a Member of the Order of Australia for "service to the superannuation industry through leadership and executive roles, to the financial services sector, to the Parliament of Victoria, and to the community.

== Personal life ==
Hyams is married and has three children.

Victorian Legislative Assembly
Preceded by Dr. Ron Wells	Member for Dromana; 1992–1996	Succeeded by Martin Dixon
