= Dorothy Goble =

Australian politician

Dorothy Ada Goble, née Taylor (11 March 1910 – 22 October 1990) was an Australian politician, a member of the Victorian Legislative Assembly from 1967 to 1976.

== Early life ==
She was born on 11 March 1910 in North Richmond, to a clerk from London Arthur Robert Taylor and locally born Ada Elizabeth née Deumer. She attended Richmond and Canterbury primary schools, before completing her education at University High School. After graduating in 1928, Dorothy got a job at the school as a secretary. She left the job upon her marriage on 4 October 1934 to Kenneth George Goble, a stationery manufacturer.

Dorothy and George had two children, a son and daughter. Though she listed her occupation as a housewife, Dorothy stayed active in public life. She became a co-director of her husband's firm in 1962, and was president of the Hartwell branch of the Australian Comforts Fund during World War II.

== Politics ==
A member of the Liberal Party, Goble held office in the Hartwell (1946–52) and Blackburn (1953–67) branches and was vice-chairman of the Victorian women's section from 1962 to 1967, serving on the state executive from 1965 to 1967.

On 29 April 1967 she was elected to the Victorian Legislative Assembly as the member for Mitcham, the first woman in the Victorian Parliament since Fanny Brownbill's death in 1948. She was also the first female member of the Liberal Party to enter Victorian Parliament.

Goble's interests were wide-ranging, with her inaugural speech discussing issues of teacher training and the science of hydrocarbons, and would later make speeches of diverse topics including prison reform, the preservation of historic buildings, the needs of the intellectually disabled, and consumer protections.

For the entirety of her nine years in Victorian Parliament, Goble was the only female member.

She served as a backbencher until her retirement on 19 March 1976.

== Later life and death ==
After her retirement, Goble resumed her position in the family firm. She died in 1990 at the age of 80.

Victorian Legislative Assembly
| New seat | Member for Mitcham; 1967–1976 | Succeeded by George Cox |
