= Silvan Province =

Former electoral province of the Victorian Legislative Council, Australia

Silvan Victoria—Legislative Council
- State: Victoria
- Created: 1992
- Abolished: 2006
- Area: 355 km^{2} (137.1 sq mi)
- Demographic: Metropolitan

Silvan Province was an electorate of the Victorian Legislative Council. It existed as a two-member electorate from 1992 to 2006, with members holding alternating eight-year terms. It was considered a safe seat for the Liberal Party for much of its history, but was a surprise gain for the Labor Party in the party's landslide victory at the 2002 state election. The electorate saw some controversy in its final term when both its members, Labor MLC Carolyn Hirsh and Liberal MLC Andrew Olexander were expelled from their respective parties for drink-driving offences. The electorate was abolished from the 2006 state election in the wake of the Bracks Labor government's reform of the Legislative Council.

It was located in the outer east of Melbourne. In 2002, when it was last contested, it covered an area of 355 km^{2} and included the suburbs of Bayswater, Belgrave, Boronia, Croydon, Monbulk, Ringwood, Upwey, Wantirna and Warrandyte.

== Members for Silvan Province ==
Member 1	Party	Year		
Rosemary Varty	Liberal	1992	Member 2	Party
Rosemary Varty	Liberal	1996	Wendy Smith	Liberal
Andrew Olexander	Liberal	1999	Wendy Smith	Liberal
Andrew Olexander	Liberal	2002	Carolyn Hirsh	Labor
Andrew Olexander	Independent	2005	Carolyn Hirsh	Independent

== Election results ==
2002 Victorian state election: Silvan Province
Party	Candidate	Votes	%	±%
Liberal	Wendy Smith	59,906	44.4	−8.4
Labor	Carolyn Hirsh	56,588	41.9	+3.5
Greens	Michael Abson	14,793	11.0	+10.7
Democrats	Tony Carden	2,333	1.7	−4.1
Hope	Leo Tischler	1,347	1.0	+1.0
Total formal votes		134,967	96.7	−0.4
Informal votes		4,549	3.3	+0.4
Turnout		139,516	93.5	
Two-party-preferred result
Labor	Carolyn Hirsh	69,885	51.8	+8.3
Liberal	Wendy Smith	65,082	48.2	−8.3
Labor gain from Liberal		Swing	+8.3	
