= Maree Davenport =

Australian politician

Member of the Victorian Legislative Council for Waverley Province
- In office 30 March 1996 – 29 November 2002 Serving with Andrew Brideson
- Succeeded by: John Lenders

Personal details
- Born: Maree Therese Marley Melbourne, Victoria, Australia
- Party: Liberal Party
- Spouse: Marcus Davenport
- Parent(s): Patrick James and Therese Mary Hamilton Marley
- Occupation: CEO, former politician

Maree Therese Davenport (née Maree Therese Marley) is an Australian politician. She was a Liberal member of the Victorian Legislative Council from 1996 to 2002, representing Waverley Province as Maree Therese Luckins.

== Early life and education ==
Maree Therese Marley was born in Melbourne, Victoria. Her parents are Patrick James and Therese Mary Hamilton Marley.

Maree earned a Master of Leadership at Deakin University.

== Politics ==
Davenport joined the Noble Park Young Liberal Party in 1986, and was active in the Young Liberals.

Davenport was endorsed as the Liberal candidate for the seat of Dandenong North in 1991 and gained a swing of over 8 per cent, but was unsuccessful by 19 votes. She was Ministerial Advisor to Minister for Industry and Employment and Deputy Leader of the Liberal party Phil Gude from 1992 until 1996 when she was elected to the Victorian Legislative Council for Waverley Province at the age of 28. She was the youngest woman elected in Victoria (with an 18-month-old son) and the first to give birth (eldest daughter), while serving as a Member of Parliament.

From 1996 to 2002, she chaired the Liberal Party health policy committee and was later appointed Shadow Parliamentary Secretary for Human Services with responsibility for Health, Housing, Community Services and Aged Care. In addition, she was appointed to serve on the Consumer Affairs, Industry and Employment, Industrial Relations, Small Business, Multicultural Affairs and Women's Affairs Policy Committees and the Victorian Parliament's Joint all-party Scrutiny of Acts and Regulations Committee (SARC). She also served as chair of the Redundant Legislation Committee and Deputy Chair of the Regulation Review Committee.

She held the seat until 2002, when she unsuccessfully attempted to transfer to the Legislative Assembly seat of Narre Warren North following a redistribution of Waverley Province.

Davenport was the endorsed Liberal candidate in the seat of Mulgrave in 2018, standing against Daniel Andrews, however, was unsuccessful, blaming ‘leadership turmoil in the Coalition Federal Government’.

== Post-parliament ==
Davenport is company director of advocacy firm Regs and Corporate Advisory Pty Ltd, also trading as Government/Gender and Corporate Advisory Network (was Phoenix Public Affairs) which she founded in 2004, specialising in peak bodies, consumer advocacy, NFP, housing, aged care, health, building and industry sectors. She is an accredited AMDRAS mediator and serves on the Australian Small Business and Family Enterprise Ombudsman (ASBFEO) Practitioner Panel. and is a member of the Australian Institute of Company Directors, Governance Institute of Australia, Mediation Institute, Resolution Institute, Victorian Women's Trust, Women on Boards, and the National Association of Women in Construction.

Maree Davenport is the author of The Australian Guide to Living Well with Endometriosis www.endoencompass.com, published by Wiley She was on the organising committee for the World Congress on Endometriosis https://www.worldendosociety.org/world-congress in Sydney in 2025 and chaired the Patient Liaison committee. She was a director, then CEO of Endometriosis Australia from 2023 to 2024.

She is a Board Director of St Vincent's Institute for Medical Research Foundation and Her Place Women's Museum Australia and a member of Chief Executive Women.

Davenport chaired the Minister for Planning's Building Advisory Council from 2013 to 2019. She served as a member of the Building Appeals Board at the Victorian Building Authority from 2010 to 2013.

Since 2013 Maree Davenport is an Ambassador for AFL's Carlton Football Club and became Ambassador for the Housing Industry Association Building Women in 2024.

== Personal life ==
She is married to Marcus Davenport, Partner <https://www.hsfkramer.com/our-people/m/marcus-davenport> at Herbert Smith Freehills Kramer, formerly a partner and foundation director for 30 years at Clayton Utz.
