= Elaine Carbines =

Australian politician (born 1957)

Elaine Carbines MLC AM

Member of the Victorian Legislative Council for Geelong Province
- In office 18 September 1999 – 24 November 2006
- Preceded by: Bill Hartigan
- Succeeded by: Abolished

Personal details
- Born: Elaine Cafferty; 4 February 1957 (age 69) Manchester, England
- Party: Labor Party
- Education: Monash University
- Profession: Teacher

Elaine Cafferty Carbines AM (born 4 February 1957) is an Australian former politician. She was a member of the Labor Party and represented Geelong Province in the Victorian Legislative Council from September 1999 to November 2006.

== Early life ==
Carbines was born in Manchester, England, but moved to Australia in 1968 after completing her elementary schooling. She received her secondary education at Mitcham High School, and studied teaching (BA 1978, Dip Ed 1979) at Monash University. It was at university where she joined the Labor Party, in response to the controversial dismissal of Labor Prime Minister Gough Whitlam by Governor-General John Kerr. After graduating, she worked as a secondary school teacher, mostly in underprivileged areas for the next twenty years.

In 1988, she gained a Diploma of Humanities from La Trobe University.

== Political life ==
Throughout her working life, Carbines remained active in politics, having been a party member since university. She was the secretary of Labor's Belmont branch in 1994, and of the Portarlington branch from 1995 to 1997. In 1996, she made an unsuccessful bid for the seat of Bellarine in the Legislative Assembly. She was a delegate to the party's state conference, representing the federal electorate of Corangamite, from 1995 to 2009.

Carbines was also actively involved in several environmental campaigns, most notably the attempt to stop the move of the Coode Island chemical plant to the environmentally sensitive Point Lillias, and a proposal to build a rowing course on the site of the Belmont Common, another environmentally sensitive area on the outskirts of Geelong. When Carbines won Labor pre-selection to make a second run for office - this time for the Legislative Council seat of Geelong Province in the lead-up to the 1999 state election, the campaign against both developments became a key part of her platform. On election day, she received a swing of nearly five percent, and defeated sitting Liberal member Bill Hartigan on preferences.

Carbines was a member of the Road Safety and Library Committees in her first three years in office. She also led the Live Music Taskforce, which attempted to solve issues related to live music venues in Melbourne perceived to be under threat due to noise complaints and development. In March 2002, in the leadup to the election due later that year, she was made Parliamentary Secretary for Education and Training. In December that year, after Labor's election victory, she was instead made Parliamentary Secretary for the Environment.

Carbines was a vocal advocate on issues of broader social significance, such as the treatment of refugees, recognition of the Australian Aboriginal flag and the issue of Tibetan independence movement. As a member of the Parliamentary Friends of Tibet Group, Carbines was among those who put their names to an advertisement taken out by the Australia-Tibet Council during a visit to Australia by Chinese President Hu Jintao in 2003.

Rumours began circulating as early as 2004 that Carbines would face a challenge to her preselection for the 2006 state election due to factional manoeuvring, with local media reporting in October 2005 that she was facing the prospect of being placed in an unwinnable position on the Labor Party's ticket for the newly created Western Victoria Region. Carbines lost her seat to Peter Kavanagh of the Democratic Labor Party after a recount.

== Post politics ==
After politics, Carbines became the CEO of the G21 Geelong Regional Alliance from 2010 to 2020. Currently, she is the Deputy Chair of Ports Victoria, G-Force Recruitment and Barwon Water and a Director of Northern Futures and AWA Alliance Bank.

In the 2020 Australia Day Honours Carbines was appointed a Member of the Order of Australia, recognising her service to conservation and the environment.

== Personal life ==
She is married to Shane Carbines, a former umpire and senior official with the Geelong Football Umpires League. She is the stepmother of Anthony Carbines, a current sitting member of the Victorian Legislative Assembly.
