= Mark Birrell =

Australian politician

Mark Alexander Birrell AM (born 7 February 1958) is a company director and a former Cabinet Minister in the Australian state of Victoria.

== Early life ==
Birrell was born in Melbourne and was educated at Trinity Grammar. He studied at Monash University obtaining a Bachelor of Economics and a Bachelor of Laws. While studying, Birrell worked for Senator Alan Missen and also served terms as president of the Victorian and federal Young Liberals. He was admitted to practice as a barrister and solicitor in 1983.

== Politics ==
When long serving MP William Campbell resigned his safe Legislative Council seat of East Yarra Province in 1983, Birrell won Liberal preselection and succeeded him as its member. He was "Victoria’s youngest MP and one of the youngest-ever in Australia." Two years later he entered the shadow Cabinet as shadow Health Minister.

Birrell became the Leader of the Liberal Party in the Legislative Council from 1988 and in 1992 he became the Government Leader of the Upper House, a position he would hold through to 1999. During this period he served as Minister for Conservation and Environment, creating the Yarra Ranges National Park, pioneering laws for coastal protection in the State, overseeing Albert Park's revitalisation, and handling key stakeholder issues.

During the first term of the Kennett government he also served as the Minister for Major Projects. He was responsible for the 'Agenda 21' infrastructure projects like the new Melbourne Convention & Exhibition Centre, Melbourne Museum, City Circle tram, Docklands and the Melbourne Sports & Aquatic Centre, along with the full restoration of the Old Treasury Building and the Regent Theatre. After the 1996 election he swapped his Ministerial portfolios for the Industry, Science and Technology portfolio. As minister he oversaw the State's first "Science, Engineering and Technology policy," legislating for 7-day shop trading, and overseeing a successful investment attraction program.

After the defeat of the Kennett Government at the 1999 election, Birrell continued as Liberal Upper House leader and served as shadow Minister for Industry, Science and Technology. Widespread media commentary called for him to switch to the lower house and take the Leadership of the Victorian Liberal Party as his predecessor Sir Rupert Hamer had done. However, Birrell decided to leave Parliament and return to private enterprise after the 2002 election.

== In private enterprise ==
Birrell is currently the a non-executive director of Transurban and serves on the Management Board of the International Organisation of Employers. Holding numerous leadership roles within the Australian Chamber of Commerce and Industry, he is currently Chair, International Chamber of Commerce (ICC). Recently he retired as the independent chairman of Australia Post Super Scheme (APSS), a fund with 30,000 members.

Birrell was made a Fellow of the Australian Institute of Company Directors in 2007 and a Companion of Engineers Australia in 2014.

Birrell was chairman of the Port of Melbourne Corporation (2011-16) and during his tenure the Port introduced a third stevedore and substantially expanded its capacity and throughput. The Victorian Government embarked on a “privatisation drive”, with Birrell overseeing the sale of the Port of Melbourne for $9.7 billion. Birrell reflects on this recycling of capital as “….a very good example of public policy working, regardless of the political party in power.” The proceeds of the sale were injected back into infrastructure projects.

Other board roles included being an independent non-executive chairman of the Australian Payments Council, the strategic coordination body for the Australian payments industry, also serving on the board of Australia Post, including as deputy Chairman, and Chairman of Regis Healthcare Limited and Evans and Peck Limited.

From 2002-2012 Birrell was the National Leader of the Infrastructure Group and special counsel at Minter Ellison.

== Not-for-profit sector ==
Volunteer roles include being Chairman of VicHealth (2012–14) and positions as a trustee of both the Melbourne Cricket Ground (1992–96), the Melbourne and Olympic Parks Trust (1995–99) and the Canterbury Girls' Secondary College School Council 2004-06).

Birrell was the founding chairman of Infrastructure Partnerships Australia, the nation's peak infrastructure body. This not-for-profit organisation undertakes research and policy advocacy on social and economic infrastructure.

He has been active in the chamber of commerce movement, including as President of the Victorian Chamber of Commerce and Industry (2013–16) and then President of the Australian Chamber of Commerce and Industry(2023-25).

== Honours ==
Birrell was appointed a Member of the Order of Australia in the 2021 Queen's Birthday Honours, recognised for "significant service to the infrastructure sector, and to business."

In 2014 he was awarded Monash University's highest honour, receiving an Honorary Doctorate of Laws for "his contributions to the policy and infrastructure sectors."
