= David Henshaw (Australian politician) =

Australian politician

David Ernest Henshaw MBE (20 December 1931 – 2 April 2008) was an Australian politician.

He was born in Perth to Norman Henshaw, a taxi driver and son of politician Ernest Henshaw, and Grace, née Ardagh. He attended Wesley College and then the University of Western Australia, where he received a Bachelor of Science (Honours). He then moved to Geelong, where he became chief research scientist of the Textile Industry Division of CSIRO from 1958 to 1982. In 1970 he was appointed a Member of the Order of the British Empire for the self-twist wool spinning machine he had developed, and he was joint winner of the Britannica Australia award for science in 1972. He joined the Labor Party in 1972, and was a South Barwon City councillor from 1978 to 1983.

Henshaw was an executive member of the Corangamite federal electorate assembly from 1973 to 1982 and was also president and secretary of the Labor Party's Belmont branch. He sat on the party's conservation and environment policy committee from 1976 to 1982 (as chair from 1978). In 1982 he was elected to the Victorian Legislative Council as member for Geelong, serving until his retirement in 1996. He resumed his membership of the conservation and environment committee, serving until 2003. Henshaw died in 2008.

Victorian Legislative Council
Preceded by Glyn Jenkins	Member for Geelong; 1982–1996; Served alongside: Rod Mackenzie; Bill Hartigan	Succeeded by Ian Cover
