= Glyn Jenkins =

Australian politician

Owen Glyndwr Jenkins (8 April 1927 – 21 August 2014) was an Australian politician.

Jenkins was born in Mildura to soldier settler Frederick John Jenkins and Doris Lewis. He was educated at Red Cliffs and then at Condamine and Toowoomba in Queensland qualifying as an accountant. From 1945 to 1946 he was a sergeant in the Australian Imperial Force. After the war he worked as a chartered accountant in Geelong. From 1966 to 1971 he served on Geelong City Council.

In 1970 Jenkins was elected to the Victorian Legislative Council for South Western, serving until 1976 when he transferred to Geelong; he was a member of the Liberal Party and served as whip from 1973 to 1979, parliamentary secretary to cabinet from 1979 to 1981, and Minister of Water Supply from 1981 to 1982. He lost his seat in 1982 and returned to chartered accountancy. Jenkins died in 2014 at Geelong.

Victorian Legislative Council
Preceded by Geoffrey Thom	Member for South Western; 1970–1976; Served alongside: Stan Gleeson	Abolished
New seat	Member for Geelong; 1976–1982; Served alongside: Rod Mackenzie	Succeeded by David Henshaw
