= Cyril Kennedy (Australian politician) =

Australian politician

Cyril James Kennedy (born 28 May 1932) is a former Australian politician.

Kennedy was born in Ulverstone in Tasmania to Leo Joseph Kennedy, a waterside worker, and Stella Elizabeth Noble. He attended Sacred Heart School and then Ulverstone State School, eventually studying at the Royal Melbourne Institute of Technology. From 1959 to 1979 he worked in advertising, marketing, photography and insurance, and was president of the Free Education Movement. A Labor Party member from 1960, he was elected to the Victorian Legislative Council in 1979 as the member for Waverley, holding the seat until his defeat at the 1992 state election.

Kennedy's younger brother, Andrew David Kennedy, also served in the Victorian state parliament (from 1982 to 1992), having earlier sat in the Australian federal parliament (from 1969 to 1972). The brothers are both fifth-generation descendants (great-great-great-grandchildren) of Mannalargenna, a 19th-century Aboriginal Tasmanian leader. Consequently, using certain definitions of Aboriginality, some sources list them as amongst the few Indigenous Australians to have been elected to Australian legislatures. The Kennedys were the only people with acknowledged Aboriginal ancestry to have served in the Victorian state parliament until Lidia Thorpe was elected in 2017.

Victorian Legislative Council
New seat	Member for Waverley; 1979–1992; Served alongside: Don Saltmarsh; Tony Van Vliet; Brian Mier	Succeeded by Andrew Brideson
