= Carolyn Hirsh =

Australian politician

Carolyn Dorothy Hirsh (born 1 August 1937) is a former Australian politician representing Silvan Province in the Victorian Legislative Council. Elected as a member of the Labor Party, she was forced to resign from the party in September 2004 after being booked for driving a car without a licence. This followed an incident earlier in the year when she had lost her licence after being booked by police with an alcohol reading of 0.07, while driving home from an ALP function. She sat as an independent member of the Legislative Council from then until November 2005, when she was re-admitted to the ALP, but was forced to resign a second time on 23 June 2006, after a second drink-driving incident.

== Early history ==
Hirsh was born in Melbourne, though she attended high school in the rural town of Colac. She trained as a teacher at Geelong Teachers College and then Monash University, where she also studied psychology. After graduating from university, she was employed as a teacher of children with disabilities, and also worked for some years in her family business. She joined the Labor Party in the late 1960s, while involved with the campaign against the Vietnam War.

== Political career ==
Hirsh worked as a psychologist for the Victorian Department of Education from 1980 to 1985, when she was elected to the Victorian Legislative Assembly as the member for Wantirna.

Hirsh was re-elected at the 1988 election, after which she was promoted to the position of Government Whip, but made an unsuccessful attempt to switch to the seat of Knox in 1992. After losing her seat, she returned to private practice as a psychologist. She made two unsuccessful attempts to move to federal politics, as the Labor candidate for the federal seat of La Trobe at the 1996 election and 1998 election. She taught at the Mountain District Learning Centre, in addition to her practice, from 1996 to 1998, before giving both away in 1999 and taking on a position at the Chisholm Institute of TAFE.

In the Labor landslide victory at the 2002 Victorian state election, Hirsh won an upset victory in the Legislative Council seat of Silvan Province, which had previously been thought to be a safe Liberal seat. In 2003, she was elected as the chair of the parliamentary Drugs and Crime Prevention Committee.

She did not contest the 2006 election.

== Alcohol problems ==
In June 2004, Hirsh was driving home from a Labor function when she was breath-tested and found to have a blood alcohol concentration (BAC) of .07, more than the legal driving limit of .05. Her licence was suspended for six months, and she was forced to resign from the Drugs and Crime Prevention Committee. In an odd coincidence, six weeks later, Andrew Olexander, the Liberal member for Silvan Province (there were two members for each Province in the Legislative Council) was also caught drink-driving, and received a similar penalty.

On 17 September 2004, Hirsh was again pulled over by police while driving, and was found to be driving while disqualified. The car she was driving also did not have a current registration sticker displayed, which is illegal, and it was reported that she gave police a false name. That night, Premier Steve Bracks publicly demanded that Hirsh quit the party, stating that "there is no room in the Labor Party for people who had so openly flouted the law". Despite pressure from the Labor Party and the media, Hirsh announced her intention to remain in Parliament as an independent. However, she continued to vote with the Labor Party, and her application in late 2005 to rejoin the Party was accepted. She rejoined on 10 November 2005, saying that the Labor Party is very much a part of "who she is".

In October 2004, Hirsh told The Age newspaper that she had been battling depression, caused by the suicide of her eldest daughter in 2001, and said that while this was not an excuse for her behaviour, it was the reason.

On 21 June 2006, she was again found by police to have been driving under the influence of alcohol with a BAC of .065, and was expected to be charged on summons for drink driving. Premier Steve Bracks announced that Hirsh had admitted herself to a hospital for psychiatric treatment, and that he would move to expel her from the Labor Party caucus a second time. She resigned from the party on 24 June.

On 12 April 2014, Hirsh told The Herald Sun about her battle with alcoholism, which ultimately led to her forced resignation in 2004 from the Drugs and Crime Prevention Committee. More of her story is told in her book, "Politics, Death and Addiction," Brolga Publishing and Pan Macmillan, retailing at $19.99.
