= Ron Wells (politician) =

Australian politician (1935–2024)

Ronald James Herbert Wells (22 September 1935 – 2 January 2024) was an Australian politician.

== Life and career ==
Ronald James Herbert Wells was born in Cardiff, New South Wales, to Cecil Wells, a businessman, and Mildred, née Tombs. He received a Higher Diploma in Accounting (Honours) from the University of Western Sydney in 1954, a Bachelor of Veterinary Science (Honours) from Sydney University in 1959, a PhD from Cambridge University in 1964, and a Master of Veterinary Science from Melbourne University in 1970. He served in the RAAF from 1955 to 1956 and worked as a veterinarian in 1960 before going to Cambridge. On his return in 1965, he was a foundation senior lecturer at the University of Melbourne's School of Veterinary Science, holding that position until 1985.

A member of the Liberal Party, Wells was elected to the Victorian Legislative Assembly in 1985 as the member for Dromana. He served until 1992, when he contested the Legislative Council seat of Eumemmerring instead. He was Opposition Spokesman on Higher Education from 1996 to 1999, when he retired from politics.

Wells died in Melbourne on 2 January 2024, at the age of 88.

Victorian Legislative Assembly
| Preceded by David Hassett | Member for Dromana; 1985–1992 | Succeeded by Tony Hyams |
Victorian Legislative Council
| Preceded by Fred Van Buren | Member for Eumemmerring; 1992–1999; Served alongside: Bob Ives; Neil Lucas | Succeeded by Gordon Rich-Phillips |
