= Roberts Dunstan =

Australian politician

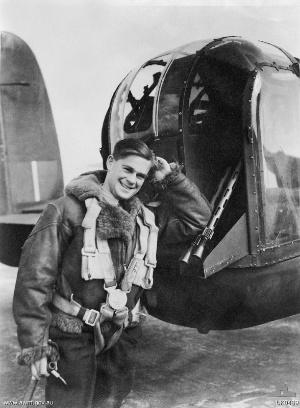
- Roberts Dunstan leaning against the rear turret of a Lancaster bomber
- Born: 5 November 1922; Bendigo, Victoria, Australia
- Died: 11 October 1989 (aged 66); Melbourne, Victoria, Australia
- Military career
- Allegiance: Australia
- Branch: Second Australian Imperial Force; Royal Australian Air Force
- Service years: 1940–1945
- Rank: Flight Lieutenant
- Conflicts: Second World War
- Awards: Distinguished Service Order
- Other work: Minister of Water Supply; Minister of Public Works

Roberts Christian "Bob" Dunstan DSO (5 November 1922 – 11 October 1989) was an Australian soldier and aviator during the Second World War. He was notable, among other things, for:

- serving with the Royal Australian Air Force (RAAF) as an air gunner, after losing a leg in action with the Australian Army;
- being the youngest Australian recipient of the Distinguished Service Order (DSO), and;
- being, at the time he was elected, the youngest ever member of the Legislative Assembly of Victoria.

Dunstan was born in Bendigo, Victoria on 5 November 1922 and attended Geelong Grammar School between 1934 and 1939.

== Australian Army ==
On 3 June 1940, five months before his 18th birthday, Dunstan joined the Australian Imperial Force.

After training with the Royal Australian Engineers, he was posted as a reinforcement to the 2/8th Field Company, in North Africa.

In January 1941, during the Allied campaign to capture Tobruk, Dunstan was wounded in the knee; the wound became infected and later required the amputation of Dunstan's leg. After recuperating in Egypt, Dunstan was returned to Australia and medically discharged.

== Royal Australian Air Force ==
After a brief return to civilian life, during which he studied law, Dunstan volunteered for service overseas with the Royal Australian Air Force. In 1942, he trained as an air gunner at Port Pirie. At the end of his course, Dunstan embarked for the United Kingdom with the rank of sergeant.

He was posted, as a rear gunner, to No. 460 Squadron RAAF, an Avro Lancaster unit, at RAF Binbrook, Lincolnshire. He flew his first operation, to Düsseldorf, on 11 June 1943 . In October, he was commissioned as a pilot officer.

During a raid on Kassel on 22–23 October 1943, the plane in which he was flying was hit by two incendiary bombs dropped by another Lancaster, which was off course. The damage caused by this accident cut off the oxygen supply to Dunstan and the other gunner, Flight Sergeant Hegarty. As a result of the oxygen starvation that both men suffered, neither saw the approach of an enemy night-fighter, and its attack badly damaged the Lancaster, one cannon shell passing through the rear-gunner's turret. The aircraft managed to return home and make a crash-landing at Bisham, the crew escaping unhurt.

Dunstan completed a full tour of 30 operations and returned to Australia in August 1944. He was awarded the Distinguished Service Order for his efforts as a "cool and skilful Air Gunner despite handicap of one leg".

He was discharged from the Royal Australian Air Force on 2 October 1945.

== Politician, journalist and film critic ==
Dunstan attracted the attention of the media due to the unique nature of his experiences: an army and air force veteran, who had completed a full tour of 30 missions despite being an amputee.

He wrote about his experiences in a book, The Sand and the Sky, and took a job as a journalist and film critic with the Melbourne Herald.

After serving as local councillor, Dunstan stood for the Victorian parliament as a Liberal candidate. Between 1956 and 1982 he was the member for Mornington. Dunstan also held two ministerial posts, with responsibility for (firstly) water supply and (secondly) public works. Dunstan died in Melbourne on 11 October 1989.
