= Laurie McArthur =

Australian politician (1930–1996)

Lawrence Alexander "Laurie" McArthur (20 August 1930 – 3 March 1996) was an Australian politician.

He was born in Hamilton to small farmer Alexander McArthur and his wife Ruth. He attended Marist Brothers College in South Australia and Ballarat Teachers' College, becoming a schoolteacher. He worked in the public education system, and was a member of the Labor Party. In 1982 he was elected to the Victorian Legislative Council as the member for Nunawading, serving until his defeat in 1988. He died in 1996.

Victorian Legislative Council
Preceded by Vernon Hauser	Member for Nunawading; 1982–1988; Served alongside: Peter Block; Rosemary Varty	Succeeded by George Cox
