= Andrew Olexander =

Australian politician (born 1965)

Andrew Olexander MLC

Member of the Victorian Legislative Council for Silvan Province
- In office 18 September 1999 – 24 November 2006
- Preceded by: Rosemary Varty

Personal details
- Born: 26 February 1965 (age 61)
- Party: Liberal Party; Independent; The Greens

Andrew Phillip Olexander (Ukrainian: Ендрю Філіп Олександер; born 26 February 1965) is a former Australian politician. He was a member of the Victorian Legislative Council representing Silvan Province from 1999 until 2006.

== Personal life ==
Olexander was born in the regional city of Geelong, and attended high school in Vermont. He studied economics at the University of Melbourne before pursuing a career in market research.

He became heavily involved with the Young Liberal movement, acting as its State President from 1989 to 1990. He also served on its Federal Policy Committee, as well as the broader party's Federal Council during the same period.

In the late 1980s Olexander, who is of Hungarian and Ukrainian descent, helped form the Australian Chernobyl Children's Relief Foundation which provided financial and medical help to victims of the Chernobyl disaster in Ukraine. He became the honorary inaugural secretary of that foundation in 1990.

Olexander is openly gay.

== Political career ==
In 1999, Olexander won pre-selection for the safe Liberal Legislative Council seat of Silvan Province, and was subsequently elected. After the Liberal Party's defeat at the 2002 election, Olexander was promoted to the shadow ministry, taking on the portfolios of Youth, Arts and Consumer Affairs in December 2002. During 2002 to 2004, he also served on the Scrutiny of Acts and Regulations Committee.

In June 2006, Olexander was reported to have drafted a private member's bill that would allow gay civil unions in Victoria. The bill was not presented to the parliament.

Olexander threatened to run against Liberal members in the Eastern Metropolitan Region for the 2006 election, but ultimately did not nominate.

=== Controversies ===
In the early hours of 11 July 2004, Olexander had been drinking and was driving home when he fell asleep at the wheel and crashed his taxpayer funded car into four parked cars in Port Melbourne. He was fined $500 and lost his licence for 12 months.

Olexander was also investigated regarding his residence. He was claiming that his Ringwood East address was his primary residence, while claiming parliamentary expenses to stay at his Docklands apartment. The president of the Legislative Council was opened an inquiry in the claiming of these benefits from a number of members, including Olexander.

He attracted some attention in late 2004 for advocating for greater funding for gambling support groups and his criticism of the government's backdown on its election promise to extend the Epping railway line to South Morang. He was ultimately forced to pay back the travel allowance that he was not entitled to.

On 7 January 2009, Olexander appeared before the Melbourne Magistrates' Court, accused of driving on the CityLink tollway three times without a pass. Magistrate Sharon Cure ordered him pay a $100 fine on each of the three counts of using an unregistered vehicle on a tollway plus $40 in court costs.

=== Expulsion from the Liberal party ===
Following the car accident in 2004, the Liberal party considered expelling Olexander, but in late July the executive decided against doing so. However, he was expected to regularly report to the state director, the only member of the Liberal parliamentary party who had to do so.

In late 2005, the question of expelling Olexander was raised again. Following his failed preselection bid, he publicly aired a series of attacks aimed at the party and its leader, Robert Doyle. Olexander claimed that the party had not earned the right to re-election and said it had been taken over by homophobic extremists. It was claimed that he failed to show up to parliament and party room meetings. Olexander claimed that he was being silenced by the party leadership, and that Doyle wanted to remove him from the party because he would support an opponent in a leadership spill. However, the party said that the move to expel Olexander was because he brought the party into disrepute.

On 29 November, Olexander was expelled from the Liberal Party, although some, including Ted Baillieu, a potential challenger to Doyle, voted against the expulsion. The Age commented on the expulsion that "Mr Olexander must have known it would end like this... [he] should have accepted his party's verdict with grace, acknowledging it as both inevitable and just. Instead, he lashed out, accusing the Liberals of bigotry and homophobia."

Olexander served out the remainder of his term in the Legislative Council sitting on the cross benches. After his parliamentary career ended, he began working with Greens leader Adam Bandt.
