= Rod Mackenzie =

Australian politician

Roderick Alexander Mackenzie OAM (born 17 October 1933) is an Australian politician. He was a member of the Victorian Legislative Council from 1979 to 1992, representing Geelong Province for the Labor Party (1979–1987) and then as an independent (1987–1992). A minister in the Cain government and President of the Victorian Legislative Council from 1985 to 1988, he resigned from the Labor Party in December 1987 and unsuccessfully recontested his seat in 1992 as part of the Geelong Community Alliance, a team of local independent candidates.

== Biography ==
Mackenzie was born in Melbourne, and was educated at Geelong South, Geelong West, Belmont and Forrest State Schools, Geelong High School, and the Gordon Institute of Technology. He was variously a plumber, plumbing inspector for the Geelong Water and Sewerage Trust, an architectural plumbing designer, a technical officer for the Commonwealth Department of Science, and a plumbing consultant before entering politics. He was a member of Australian Antarctic expeditions in 1966, 1967, 1968, 1973 and 1974. He served as president of the Matthew Flinders Girls' High School Parents and Citizens and the Geelong Movement Against Uranium Mining, and was a youth club leader in the Geelong suburbs of Belmont and Highton for 24 years.

Mackenzie joined the Labor Party in 1971 over opposition to conscription for the Vietnam War, was president of the Geelong branch from 1973 to 1974, and established a party regional office in Geelong. He contested the Geelong Province seat in the Legislative Council at the 1976 election, losing to Liberal Glyn Jenkins, but ran again successfully at the 1979 election. He served as party spokesperson on public works from 1979 to 1982 when Labor was in opposition, and served as Minister for Soldier Settlement (1982), Minister for Forests and Minister For Lands (1982–1983), and Minister for Conservation, Forests and Lands (1983–1985) in the first term of the Cain government after their 1982 election victory. Mackenzie was then appointed President of the Victorian Legislative Council, serving from 1985 to 1988, and was the first Labor member ever to preside over the traditionally conservative chamber.

In 1987, Mackenzie crossed the floor to vote with the conservative parties against Labor electoral reforms that he viewed as "blatantly political". The party moved to expel him for voting against the Labor caucus, and he resigned from the party in December, one day before the planned vote on his expulsion. He stepped down as President of the Legislative Council in 1988 when Labor refused to support him continuing in the role, and served out his term as an independent.

Mackenzie sought to run for re-election at the 1992 state election under the banner of the Geelong Community Alliance, a group of independents he had founded and formally registered as a political party. The alliance, which included radio announcer Roger Kent and former Geelong trades hall secretary Malcolm Brough, received significant local media attention, but was unsuccessful, as Mackenzie was soundly defeated by Liberal candidate Bill Hartigan and only Kent in the Legislative Assembly seat of Geelong polled well enough for his preferences to affect the outcome.

Mackenzie subsequently contested the 1996 local government elections for the Shire of Golden Plains, but was unsuccessful. A long-time campaigner for voluntary euthanasia, he has served as patron of Dying With Dignity Victoria and has been a frequent spokesperson in favour of law reform in this area. He has also campaigned with former opponent and Liberal minister Glyn Jenkins around issues of water supply to the Geelong region. In retirement, Mackenzie has also been an occasional columnist for the Geelong Advertiser.

He received the Medal of the Order of Australia in 1999 for his services to the Geelong community.

Victorian Legislative Council
Preceded by New seat	Member for Geelong Province; 1979–1992; With: Glyn Jenkins, David Henshaw	Succeeded by Bill Hartigan
