= Electoral district of Mitcham (Victoria) =

Former state electoral district of Victoria, Australia

Mitcham Victoria—Legislative Assembly
- State: Victoria
- Created: 1967
- Abolished: 2014
- Electors: 37,054 (2010)
- Area: 24 km^{2} (9.3 sq mi)
- Demographic: Metropolitan

The Electoral district of Mitcham was an electoral district of the Victorian Legislative Assembly. It was centered on Mitcham and Blackburn in the eastern suburbs of Melbourne.

Created prior to the 1967 election it was, with one exception, always held by the current government. The one exception was a 1997 by-election which was won by the Labor Party with a massive 16% swing, signaling a revival in the performance of the ALP prior to the 1999 election where they narrowly retained the seat and even more narrowly won government.

Mitcham was abolished in 2014 and largely replaced by Ringwood.

== Members for Mitcham ==
Member	Party	Term
Dorothy Goble	Liberal	1967–1976
George Cox	Liberal	1976–1982
John Harrowfield	Labor	1982–1992
Roger Pescott	Liberal	1992–1997
Tony Robinson	Labor	1997–2010
Dee Ryall	Liberal	2010–2014

== Election results ==
2010 Victorian state election: Mitcham
Party	Candidate	Votes	%	±%
Liberal	Dee Ryall	15,717	46.55	+7.09
Labor	Tony Robinson	11,669	34.56	−5.56
Greens	Sheridan Lewis	4,024	11.92	+0.33
Sex Party	Paul Elliott	963	2.85	+2.85
Family First	Daniel Ha	758	2.25	−2.28
Democratic Labor	Barry O'Shea	632	1.87	+1.87
Total formal votes		33,763	96.55	+0.06
Informal votes		1,208	3.45	−0.06
Turnout		34,971	94.38	−0.10
Two-party-preferred result
Liberal	Dee Ryall	17,852	52.90	+4.77
Labor	Tony Robinson	15,895	47.10	−4.77
Liberal gain from Labor		Swing	+4.77	

== See also ==
- Parliaments of the Australian states and territories
- List of members of the Victorian Legislative Assembly
