= George Cox (Victorian politician) =

Australian politician

George Henry Cox (born 29 December 1931) is an Australian politician. He was a Liberal Party member of the Victorian Legislative Assembly from 1976 to 1982, representing the electorate of Mitcham, and a member of the Victorian Legislative Council from 1988 to 1996, representing Nunawading Province.

Cox was born in Forbes, New South Wales, and was educated at Shepparton, Warracknabeal, Faraday and Lee St Carlton State Schools, Swinburne Technical School and Box Hill High School. He was a technical representative and laboratory technician for a paint company before entering politics. He was an amateur competitive cyclist from 1949 to 1956, competing in the United Kingdom, Ireland, Belgium, Switzerland and Germany. Cox was a City of Nunawading councillor from 1966 to 1969 and was campaign manager for Mitcham Liberal MLA Dorothy Goble at the 1970 and 1973 elections.

Goble retired at the 1976 election, and Cox was elected to succeed her in the seat. He was re-elected in 1979, but was defeated by Labor candidate John Harrowfield at the 1982 election. He worked as an adviser to the state opposition leader immediately after his election defeat, was an investment adviser for the Australian Natives Association from 1983 to 1988, and was a part-time staffer for federal Liberal MP Michael Wooldridge from 1987 to 1988. He also unsuccessfully contested the Legislative Assembly seat of Box Hill at the 1985 election.

Cox made a second bid to re-enter politics at the 1988 election, when he regained the Liberal-leaning Legislative Council seat of Nunawading Province after their loss to Labor there in 1985. He served on the arts, conservation and environment and government tourism committees while in the Legislative Council, and retired in 1996 at the conclusion of his term.

Parliament of Victoria
Victorian Legislative Assembly
Preceded by Dorothy Goble	Member for Mitcham; 1976–1982	Succeeded by John Harrowfield
Victorian Legislative Council
Preceded by Laurie McArthur	Member for Nunawading Province; 1988–1996; With: Rosemary Varty	Succeeded by Seat abolished
