= Tony Van Vliet (Australian politician) =

Australian politician

Anthony Van Vliet (22 October 1933 – 16 October 1982) was an Australian politician. A teacher by profession, he was elected to the Victorian Legislative Council as the Labor Party member for Waverley Province at the 1982 state election, but died suddenly before he could be sworn in.

Van Vliet was born and raised in Amsterdam in the Netherlands. He moved to Australia in 1952, subsequently studying education at the University of Melbourne. He was a teacher and careers counsellor at Monash High School from 1972 to 1981, and was the deputy principal at Moorabbin High School at the time of his election in 1982. He was actively involved in teachers unions throughout his career, serving as the secretary of his school branch and serving on the central committee of the Victorian Secondary Teachers Association from 1973 to 1974. He was also involved in a number of community groups, serving stints as treasurer of the Westernport Regional Council for Social Development and president of the Springvale Community Aid Bureau.

Van Vliet had made two previous unsuccessful attempts to enter parliament as the Labor candidate for the Legislative Assembly seat of Noble Park at the 1976 election and 1979 election before deciding to run for the Legislative Council in 1982. He won Labor preselection to contest the marginal Liberal-held Legislative Council seat of Waverley Province at the 1982 state election and was successful in the state election, winning the open seat amidst Labor's statewide victory under John Cain. He fell ill soon after, and was unable to be sworn in to take his seat before his sudden death on 16 October. The resulting by-election was won by Labor candidate Brian Mier.
