= Bill Hartigan =

Australian politician (1934–2023)

William Anthony Neville Hartigan (9 November 1934 – 13 July 2023) was an Australian politician.

== Life and career ==
Hartigan was born in Sydney and attended St Joseph's College in Hunters Hill. He studied economics at the Australian National University and from 1952 worked in the Public Service. In 1961 he became tariff officer with the Associated Chamber of Manufacturers of Australia, and he held a number of senior positions in the Ford Motor Company in Australia, New Zealand and Japan from 1963 to 1991. He was a member of the Liberal Party, serving as North Balwyn branch president from 1970 to 1972, and from 1974 to 1980 he sat on Camberwell City Council.

In 1992 Hartigan was elected to the Victorian Legislative Council as a Liberal member for Geelong Province. He served until his defeat by Labor candidate Elaine Carbines in 1999.

Bill Hartigan died on 13 July 2023, at the age of 88.
