= Andrew Brideson =

Australian politician

Andrew Ronald Brideson is an Australian politician. He was a Liberal member of the Victorian Legislative Council from 1992 until 2006, representing Waverley Province. A former teacher and trade unionist, he was a backbencher for about half of his career. The other half was spent as Chairman of the Drugs and Crime Prevention Committee 1996-99 and Chairman of the prestigious Road Safety Committee from 1999–2002. He served two years as Shadow Cabinet Secretary in an understaffed shadow ministry from 2002- 2004. He did not contest the 2006 state election, having a long-standing belief that political parties need to regenerate.

== Early life and education ==
Brideson was born in the Melbourne suburb of Brighton, and studied at Bentleigh and McKinnon High Schools. He studied teaching at Frankston Teachers College and the Hawthorn Institute of Education

== Teaching career ==
Brideson occupied teaching positions at various rural schools in the West Gippsland and Wimmera regions between 1964 and 1975. In 1976, he was promoted to the position of deputy principal, and worked in this position in a number of schools.

During his teaching career, Brideson had been an active trade unionist in both the Teachers Association of Australia and Victorian Affiliated Teachers Federation, and at the end of the 1983 school year, took up positions heading both organisations. In a rare move for a unionist, Brideson acted as an advisor to several shadow ministers in the conservative Liberal Party state opposition of the time. He was an active participant in the Victorian Trades Hall Council and was a delegate at ACTU conferences. He led the Victorian organisation until his move into politics in October 1992.

== Politics ==
In the leadup to the 1992 state election, Brideson succeeded in obtaining Liberal preselection for the seat of Waverley Province which was held by the Labor Party. In his first six-year term, he served on the Public Bodies Review Committee (1992–1996).He also served as the parliamentary representative on the Monash University Council from 1997. However, he was overlooked for a ministerial position in Jeff Kennett's Liberal government.

He was re-elected at the 1999 election, which saw the Liberal Party lose power to the Labor Party under Steve Bracks, but was subsequently appointed Chairman of the Road Safety Committee regardless. In this way, he headed an inquiry that aimed to bring down the number of road deaths, after it had reached its highest number for several years. Though his term was for the most part relatively uneventful, Brideson was involved in a minor scandal in 2001 when he was accused of plagiarising parts of a parliamentary report by taking slabs of material directly from the internet.

Brideson did not face election in 2002, which saw the Liberal opposition defeated in a landslide, which saw the other Liberal member for Waverley Province lose their seat, as well as several shadow members. The devastating loss opened up numerous shadow ministerial positions, and Brideson was given the portfolios of scrutiny of government and waste watch and appointed as the Secretary to the Shadow Cabinet. He was a relatively low-profile figure in these roles, however, and received far less attention than his predecessor, David Davis. He subsequently lost the first two positions to younger MLC Richard Dalla-Riva in January 2004, though he remained Secretary to the Shadow Cabinet without portfolio for the remainder of his career.

Brideson kept a particularly low profile after his demotion, and rumours of his impending retirement began circulating in late 2004. On 11 March 2005, Brideson became the second Liberal frontbencher to announce publicly that he would not be contesting his seat at the 2006 state election. He also suggested that other older Liberal MPs should consider stepping down at the election.
