= Fred Van Buren =

Australian politician

Charles Frederick Van Buren (Dutch: [vɑm ˈbyːrə(n)]; 20 June 1936 – 11 September 2006) was an Australian politician.

Van Buren was born in Kollupitiya in Ceylon, where he was educated. His father, Charles Frederick Guy Van Buren, was a Dutch Burgher, while his mother, Blossom Isabella Enright, was of Eurasian descent. He worked as a printer, and after moving to Australia was an organiser with the Labor Party's Victorian branch from 1974 to 1985.

In 1985 Van Buren was elected to the Victorian Legislative Council for Eumemmerring, serving until he was defeated in 1992. Van Buren died in 2006.

Victorian Legislative Council
New seat	Member for Eumemmerring; 1985–1992; Served alongside: Bob Ives	Succeeded by Ron Wells
