= Nunawading Province =

Former electoral province of the Victorian Legislative Council, Australia

Coordinates: 37°49′S 145°11′E

Nunawading Province Victoria—Legislative Council
- State: Victoria
- Created: 1976
- Abolished: 1996
- Namesake: Nunawading
- Demographic: Metropolitan

Nunawading Province was an electorate of the Victorian Legislative Council. It was created in 1976, based in the outer eastern Melbourne suburbs including Nunawading. It was finally abolished 29 March 1996. Much of its area was replaced by Koonung Province.

In the 1985 election, the result for this province was subject to much controversy when the vote ended with a complete dead heat after preferences. Both the Labor candidate Bob Ives and the Liberal candidate Rosemary Varty received 54,821 votes each. The returning officer, Kathleen Leonard, was required by law to make a casting vote, which she did so by drawing a name from a ballot box. The name drawn was Bob Ives and he was declared elected.

This result did not stand, and a by-election was called, in which the Liberal candidate Varty won with a swing to her.

== Members for Nunawading Province ==
Member 1	Party	Year		
Vernon Hauser	Liberal	1976	Member 2	Party
Vernon Hauser	Liberal	1979	Peter Block	Liberal
Laurie McArthur	Labor	1982	Peter Block	Liberal
Laurie McArthur	Labor	1985	Bob Ives	Labor
Laurie McArthur	Labor	1985	Rosemary Varty	Liberal
George Cox	Liberal	1988	Rosemary Varty	Liberal

== Election results ==
1988 Victorian state election: Nunawading Province
Party	Candidate	Votes	%	±%
Liberal	George Cox	56,764	51.1	+5.0
Labor	Laurie McArthur	54,308	48.9	+3.1
Total formal votes		111,072	96.7	−1.0
Informal votes		3,782	3.3	+1.0
Turnout		114,854	93.4	−0.6
Liberal gain from Labor		Swing	+1.1	
