= Geelong Province =

Former electoral province of the Victorian Legislative Council, Australia

Coordinates: 38°09′S 144°21′E

Geelong Province Victoria—Legislative Council
- State: Victoria
- Created: 1976
- Abolished: 2006
- Namesake: City of Geelong
- Demographic: Metropolitan

Geelong Province was an electorate of the Victorian Legislative Council until 2006, located around Geelong. It was abolished from the 2006 state election in the wake of the Bracks Labor government's reform of the Legislative Council. The area of the former Geelong Province then became part of the larger Western Victoria Region.

== Members for Geelong Province ==
Member 1	Party	Year		
Glyn Jenkins	Liberal	1976	Member 2	Party
Glyn Jenkins	Liberal	1979	Rod Mackenzie	Labor
David Henshaw	Labor	1982	Rod Mackenzie	Labor
David Henshaw	Labor	1985	Rod Mackenzie	Labor
David Henshaw	Labor	1987	Rod Mackenzie	Independent
David Henshaw	Labor	1988	Rod Mackenzie	Independent
David Henshaw	Labor	1992	Bill Hartigan	Liberal
Ian Cover	Liberal	1996	Bill Hartigan	Liberal
Ian Cover	Liberal	1999	Elaine Carbines	Labor
John Eren	Labor	2002	Elaine Carbines	Labor

Eren went on to represent the Electoral district of Lara in the Victorian Legislative Assembly from 25 November 2006.

== Election results ==
2002 Victorian state election: Geelong Province
Party	Candidate	Votes	%	±%
Labor	John Eren	72,683	51.2	+5.7
Liberal	Ian Cover	51,059	36.0	−9.2
Greens	Bruce Murray	11,904	8.4	+4.3
Democrats	Erica Menheere-Thompson	3,255	2.3	−2.9
Christian Democrats	Alan Barron	1,826	1.3	+1.3
Independent	Val Nicholls	1,144	0.8	+0.8
Total formal votes		141,871	97.0	−0.5
Informal votes		4,395	3.0	+0.5
Turnout		146,266	94.3	
Two-party-preferred result
Labor	John Eren	86,253	60.8	+8.8
Liberal	Ian Cover	55,564	39.2	−8.8
Labor gain from Liberal		Swing	+8.8	
