= Waverley Province =

Former electoral province of the Victorian Legislative Council, Australia

Waverley Province Victoria—Legislative Council
- State: Victoria
- Created: 1976
- Abolished: 2006
- Area: 107 km^{2} (41.3 sq mi)
- Demographic: Metropolitan

Waverley Province was an electorate of the Victorian Legislative Council. It existed as a two-member electorate from 1976 to 2006, with members holding alternating eight-year terms. It was a marginal seat for its entire existence, often changing parties according to who held government at the time. It was abolished from the 2006 state election in the wake of the Bracks Labor government's reform of the Legislative Council.

It was located in the south-east suburbs of Melbourne. In 2002, when it was last contested, it covered an area of 107km^{2} and included the suburbs of Carnegie, Clayton, Glen Waverley, Mount Waverley, Mulgrave, Noble Park, Oakleigh and Springvale.

== Members for Waverley Province ==
Member 1	Party	Year		
Don Saltmarsh	Liberal	1976	Member 2	Party
Don Saltmarsh	Liberal	1979	Cyril Kennedy	Labor
Tony Van Vliet^{[d]}	Labor	1982	Cyril Kennedy	Labor
Brian Mier	Labor	1982	Cyril Kennedy	Labor
Brian Mier	Labor	1985	Cyril Kennedy	Labor
Brian Mier	Labor	1988	Cyril Kennedy	Labor
Brian Mier	Labor	1992	Andrew Brideson	Liberal
Maree Luckins	Liberal	1996	Andrew Brideson	Liberal
Maree Luckins	Liberal	1999	Andrew Brideson	Liberal
John Lenders	Labor	2002	Andrew Brideson	Liberal

^{[d]} Vliet died 16 October 1982

== Election results ==
2002 Victorian state election: Waverley Province
Party	Candidate	Votes	%	±%
Labor	John Lenders	67,950	54.0	+6.2
Liberal	Denise McGill	43,226	34.3	−9.7
Greens	Heather Welsh	11,238	8.9	+8.8
Democrats	Polly Morgan	3,447	2.7	−4.3
Total formal votes		125,861	96.2	+0.4
Informal votes		4,915	3.8	−0.4
Turnout		130,776	92.9	
Two-party-preferred result
Labor	John Lenders	78,478	62.4	+9.8
Liberal	Denise McGill	47,362	37.6	−9.8
Labor hold		Swing	+9.8	
