= Eumemmerring Province =

Former electoral province of the Victorian Legislative Council, Australia

Eumemmerring Province Victoria—Legislative Council
- State: Victoria
- Created: 1985
- Abolished: 2006
- Namesake: Suburb of Eumemmerring

Eumemmerring Province was an electorate of the Victorian Legislative Council. It existed as a two-member electorate from 1985 to 2006, with members holding alternating eight-year terms. It was a marginal seat throughout its existence, changing parties in the large landslide elections of 1992 and 2002. It was abolished from the 2006 state election in the wake of the Bracks Labor government's reform of the Legislative Council.

It was located on the south-eastern fringe of Melbourne. In 2002, when it was last contested, it covered an area of 2,199 km^{2} and included the suburbs of Berwick, Cockatoo, Dandenong, Emerald, Gembrook, Narre Warren, Warburton, and Yarra Junction.

== Members for Eumemmerring Province ==
Member 1	Party	Year		
Fred Van Buren	Labor	1985	Member 2	Party
Fred Van Buren	Labor	1988	Bob Ives	Labor
Ron Wells	Liberal	1992	Bob Ives	Labor
Ron Wells	Liberal	1996	Neil Lucas	Liberal
Gordon Rich-Phillips	Liberal	1999	Neil Lucas	Liberal
Gordon Rich-Phillips	Liberal	2002	Adem Somyurek	Labor

== Election results ==
2002 Victorian state election: Eumemmerring Province
Party	Candidate	Votes	%	±%
Labor	Adem Somyurek	67,534	52.9	+8.4
Liberal	Mick Morland	46,120	36.1	−10.1
Greens	Val Kay	14,059	11.0	+11.0
Total formal votes		127,713	95.8	−0.1
Informal votes		5,546	4.2	+0.1
Turnout		133,259	93.4	
Two-party-preferred result
Labor	Adem Somyurek	76,438	59.9	+10.5
Liberal	Mick Morland	51,230	40.1	−10.5
Labor gain from Liberal		Swing	+10.5	
