= Rosemary Varty =

Australian politician

Rosemary Varty OAM (born 20 December 1933) is an Australian politician. She was a Liberal Party member of the Victorian Legislative Council from 1985 to 1999, representing Nunawading Province (1985–1992) and Silvan Province (1992–1999).

Varty was born in Lilydale, and was a financial controller and administration manager before entering politics. She was a City of Box Hill councillor from 1981 to 1984, and was a member of the Australian Local Government Women's Association from 1981 to 1993. A long-time member of the Liberal Party, she ran for Liberal preselection eight times before being ultimately successful in 1985.

At the 1985 state election, Liberal candidate Varty and Labor Party candidate Bob Ives finished in a tied result for the seat of Nunawading Province, which The Age described as "the most sensational electoral finish in memory". The returning officer drew Ives' name out of a box and declared him elected, which gave Labor control of the Legislative Council. Varty successfully disputed the result in the Court of Disputed Returns and easily won a court-ordered August 1985 by-election. Her seat of Nunawading Province was abolished at the end of her first term in 1992, and she subsequently contested and won the new seat of Silvan Province.

Varty was appointed secretary to the shadow cabinet in 1989, and continued as parliamentary secretary to the cabinet when the Liberal Party won government under Jeff Kennett in 1992. She remained in the role until her retirement at the 1999 election She later contested the 2000 local government elections for the Shire of Yarra Ranges, but was unsuccessful.

Varty was awarded the Medal of the Order of Australia in the 2021 Queen's Birthday Honours for "service to the community, and to lawn bowls".

Victorian Legislative Council
Preceded by Peter Block	Member for Nunawading Province; 1985–1992; With: Laurie McArthur, George Cox	Succeeded by Seat abolished
Preceded by New seat	Member for Silvan Province; 1992–1999; With: Wendy Smith	Succeeded by Andrew Olexander
