= Bob Ives =

Australian politician (1938–2026)

Robert Stuart Ives (16 December 1938 – 20 August 2026) was an Australian politician.

== Life and career ==
Robert Stuart Ives was born in Kalgoorlie, Western Australia on 16 December 1938. He attended Eastern Goldfields High School. He graduated from the University of Western Australia in 1959 with a Bachelor of Arts (Honours), adding a Diploma of Education in 1960 and a Master of Arts in 1963. He worked as a teacher, and in 1965 moved to Melbourne, where he became a management consultant with BCA. Having joined the Labor Party in 1967, he was officer-in-charge of the Personnel Practice Section of the Commonwealth Department of Labour and National Service from 1972 to 1974. In 1975 he became a lecturer in Management and Organisational Behaviour at Swinburne College of Technology before joining the staff of Senator John Button in 1978. He returned to Swinburne in 1982, leaving again in 1986 to work as a government liaison officer to the Victorian Ministry for the Arts. He joined Senator Barney Cooney's staff in 1987.

Ives was active in Labor Party branches, serving as president of the Balwyn branch from 1973 to 1978, and secretary of the Kooyong Federal Electorate Committee from 1973 to 1978 and 1982 to 1984. He was a state conference delegate (1975–86), member of the Administrative Committee State Branch (1980–89) and secretary of the Foreign Affairs Policy Committee (1986–90).

In 1983, he ran unsuccessfully in a by-election for East Yarra Province in the Victorian Legislative Council. In 1985, he stood for election in the Council province of Nunawading. At the end of counting, Ives and the Liberal candidate, Rosemary Varty, were tied. Ives was declared the winner on the casting vote of the returning officer, who drew Ives’ name from a hat. The result was particularly important because the outcome decided control of the Legislative Council. However, before Ives could take his seat, the result was voided by a Court of Disputed Returns, on the basis that 44 votes had been incorrectly excluded from the count, and the court ordered a by-election, which Varty won.

He was elected for Eumemmerring Province in 1988, serving until his defeat in 1996. During that time, he served on numerous committees but never left the back bench.

Ives died on 20 August 2026, at the age of 87.

Victorian Legislative Council
New seat	Member for Eumemmerring; 1988–1996; Served alongside: Fred Van Buren, Ron Wells	Succeeded by Neil Lucas
