= Boom style architecture =

Victorian architectural style

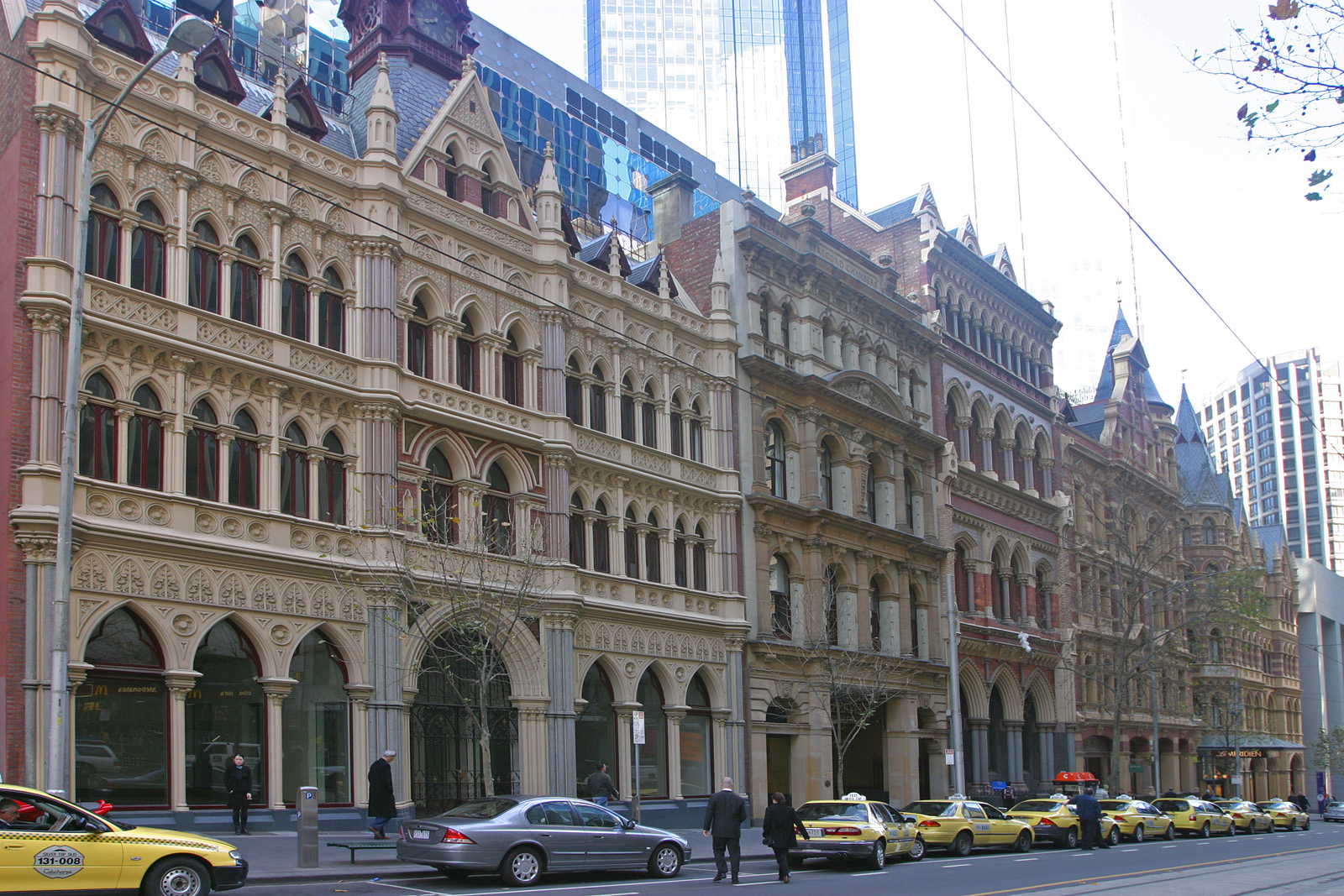
The Rialto Group of buildings, a notable boom style streetscape in Melbourne. From left: the Olderfleet (1889-90), Record Chambers (1887), New Zealand Chambers (1887), Winfield (1891) and Rialto buildings (1890-91)

Boom style (more often termed "Late Victorian" architecture elsewhere) is a term used to describe the architecture of Melbourne from the land boom period (1883–1891). Boom style buildings were often distinguished by their lavish ornament. A massive property bubble created wildly speculative values for land and excessive borrowing which was initially aided by generational wealth from the Victorian gold rush. Additional hype generated from the city's growing reputation as a boom town, including being labelled 'Marvellous Melbourne' by George Augustus Sala in 1885, fuelled one of the largest speculative construction periods seen in the southern hemisphere. Owners of residential and commercial property, confident that ever increasing prices would exceed their debts, would often engage architects to create exuberant designs in exotic styles that signified extreme wealth, something fashionable during the 1880s. These contrasted markedly with the much more restrained Georgian and Renaissance Revival and styles of previous construction periods. Its influence in government building, typically more fiscally conservative, was most felt in the educational buildings of the Public Works Department which followed the lead of the prestigious private schools. However at the end of the boom in 1889 prices soared so high that properties pushed skyward to maximise the value of land which was itself excessively overvalued. Borrowings far exceeded the value of the buildings and most of the Land Boomers ended in bankruptcy with most of the cost of construction never recovered, which had a ripple effect which by the early 1890s had crippled the Victorian economy. Some boom style buildings remained incomplete into the 1890s due to the crash and were shortlived due to their impracticality. For a period of time the phrase was used derogatively during a period when the style was "on the nose" due to association with bad debts and corruption, and as further justification for their demolition. Annear documents numbers of such buildings destroyed, from the 1890s and into the 1980s, by the family firm Whelan the Wrecker.

Though a bubble existed elsewhere and ended with the Australian banking crisis of 1893, the term's use is rare elsewhere (Ballarat and Bendigo experienced relatively moderate speculation during the period but due to their own property booms also have some civic buildings with similar attributes). Sydney's architecture the period was generally more modest and contributed to its economy rebounding from the financial crisis whereas Melbourne's did not. The phrase is sometimes used, uncapitalised, to designate similar opulent architecture of overlapping periods across the late British Empire, and to some extent in America.

== Background ==
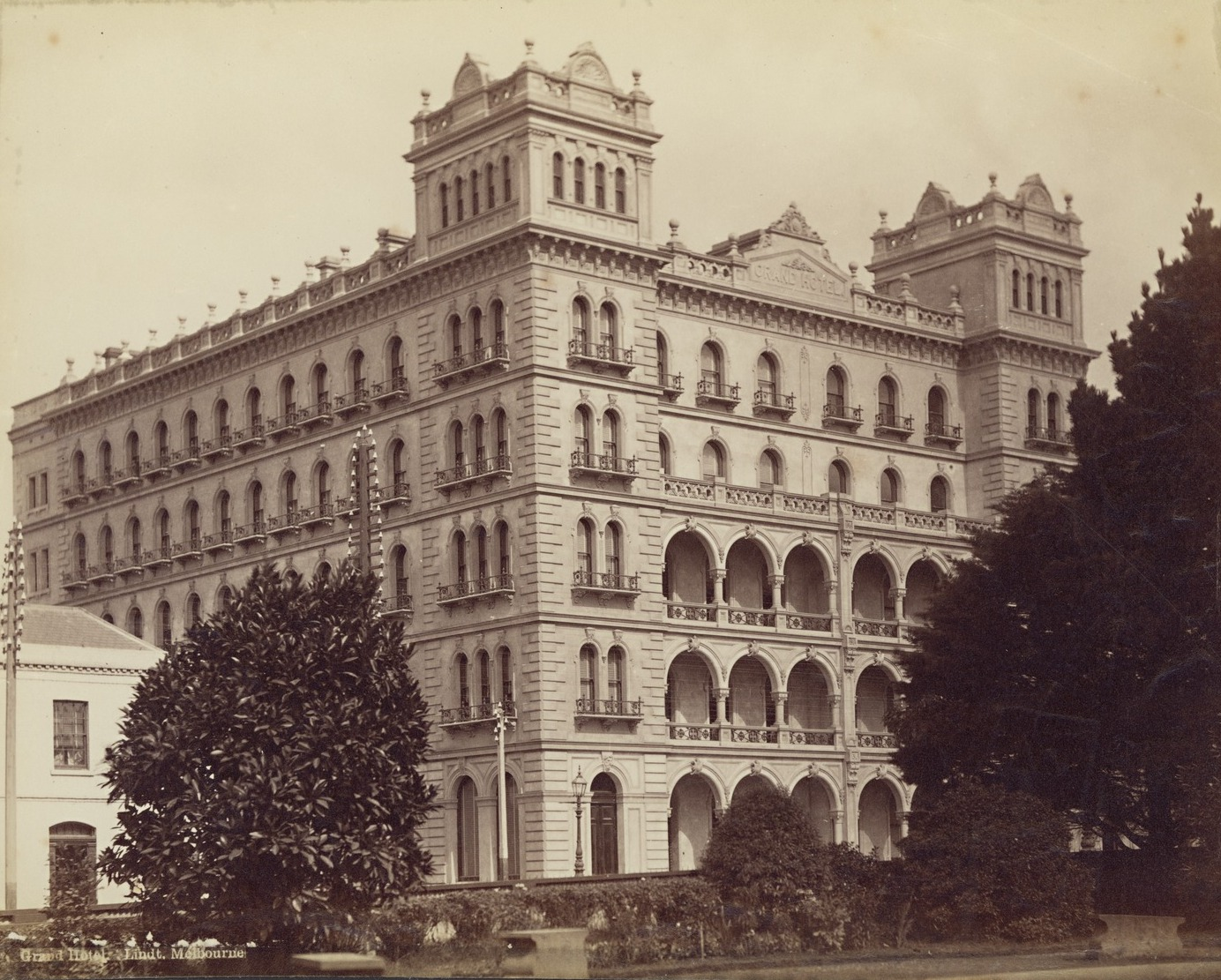
Grand Hotel Melbourne in 1884

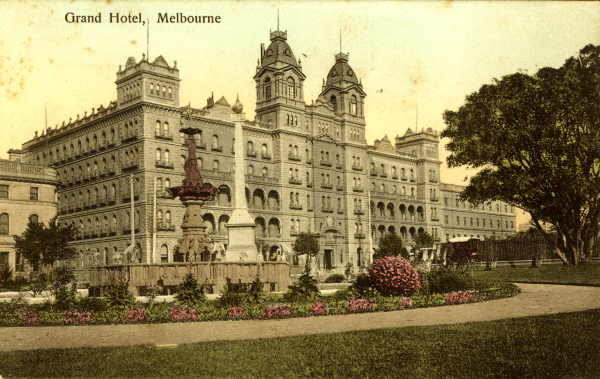
More than doubled in size in just 4 years becoming the Grand Coffee Palace

In the 19th century, there was a significant increase in the construction of civic buildings in urban areas throughout the British Empire supported by the rise of the middle class and its leisure activities accommodated by theatres, shopping arcades, and coffee houses. These buildings embraced the latest architectural trends incorporating both Gothic and classical elements in an unconventional manner to create visually stunning effects in a design approach, criticised in the Modernist period by such commentators as Freeland, as uneducated eclecticism or frivolousness.

== Australia ==
King and Willis note that the term ‘Boom Style’ (as capitalised) has entered the lexicon of Australian architectural historians, its first usage being accepted as by Robyn Boyd in the 1952 edition of his Australia's Home.

The Australian gold rushes led to a fivefold population increase within a mere thirty-year period attracting opportunists and adventurers from around the world and the resultant wealth funded the emergence, particularly in Melbourne, and to a lesser extent in Sydney and Brisbane, of a lavish architectural style known since as the Boom style. The period between the gold rushes and the major depression of the 1890s witnessed a significant surge in building activity, encompassing both residential and secular structures, as well as religious buildings. Previously limited to three or four stories, commercial office buildings in the Boom Style reached 'skyscraper' heights.

=== Melbourne ===
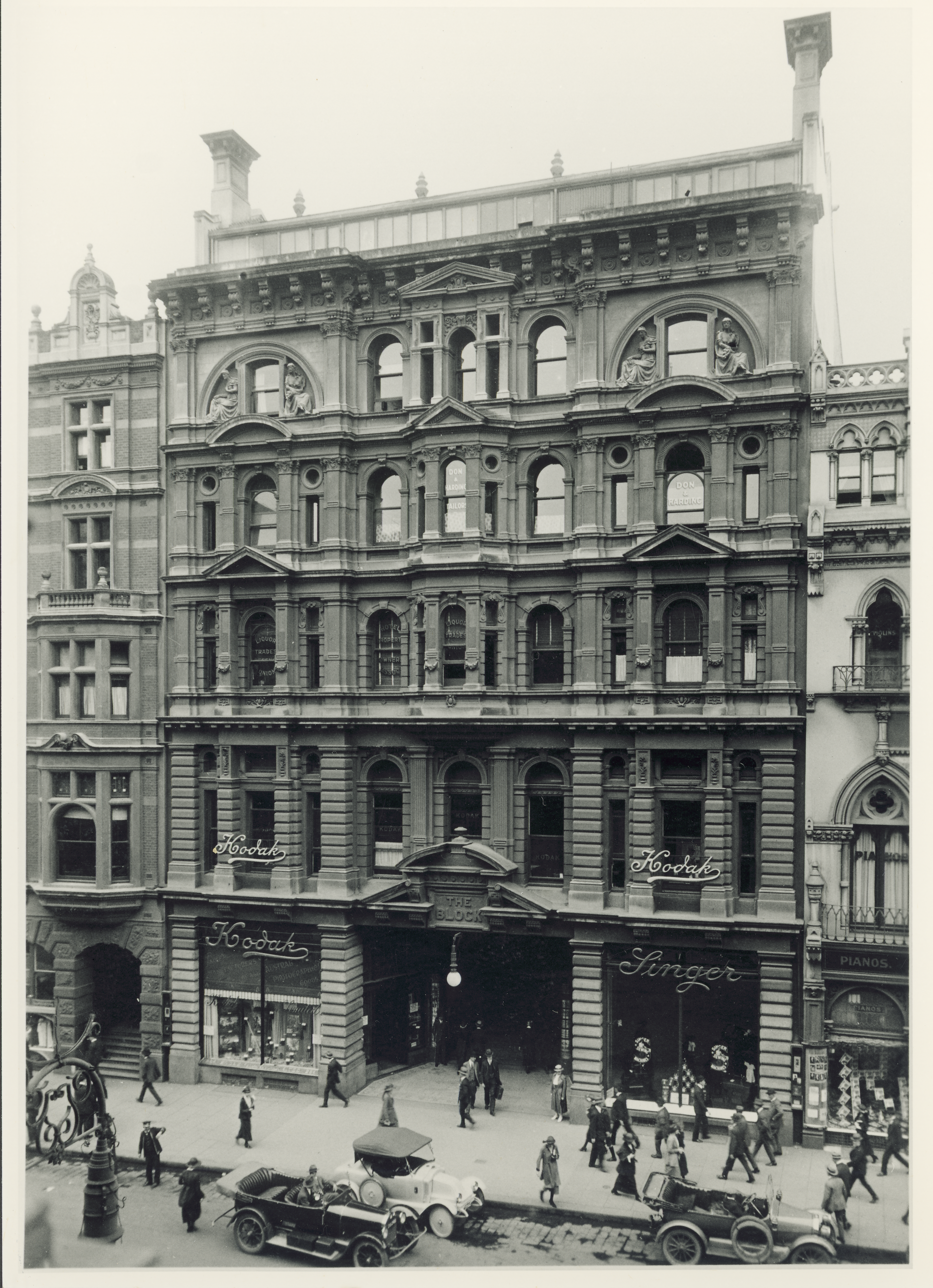
Block Arcade, 280–286 Collins Street, Melbourne c. 1930–1939 (constructed 1891–1893)

Melbourne in particular, as the capital of the colony in which most gold was discovered, experienced a rapid influx of money, which contributed to the city's growth. This period marked the prevalence of elaborately decorated Victorian architecture in the city recognised as ‘Marvellous Melbourne” The centres of gold mining including Ballarat and Bendigo, and even the now smaller towns such as Clunes, Maryborough, Daylesford and Beechworth also feature such buildings.

== Characteristics ==
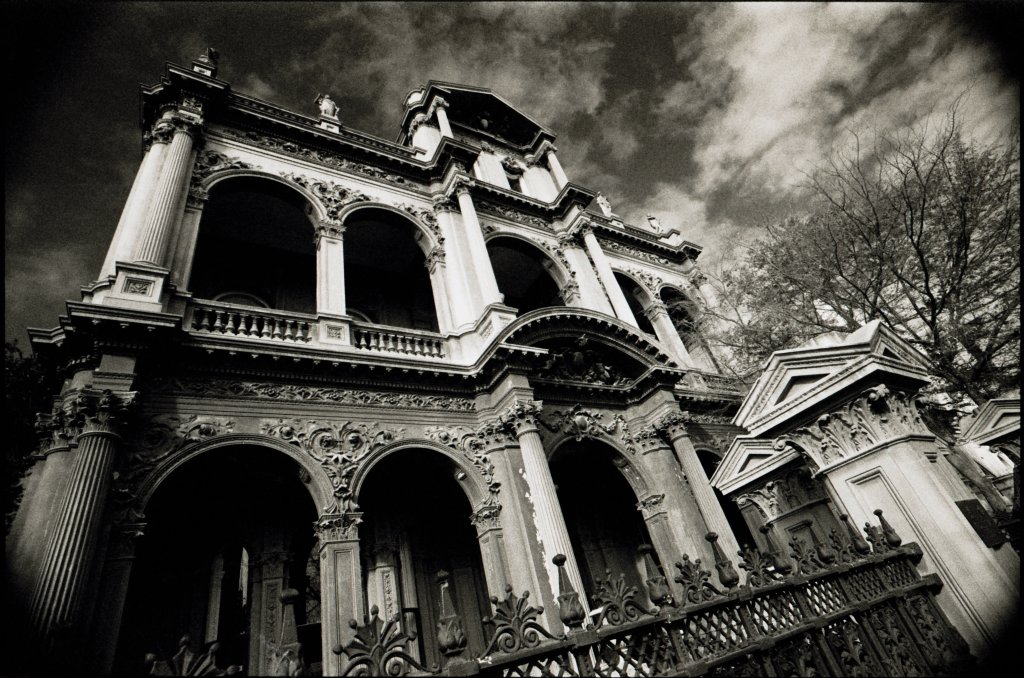
Medley Hall located at 44 Drummond Street, Carlton (completed 1893)

In the late 1880s and early 1890s, the Boom Style gained prominence, featuring unrestrainedly ornate facades. Stucco parapets or balustrades concealed the roofs, colored-brick patterns were common, and cast-iron verandas and stained glass around the front doors were chararcteristc. Architectural historians categorise 'Boom style' into sub-styles such as Georgian Colonial, Gothic Revival, Renaissance Revival, and French Second Empire.

Architects rose to the challenge of satisfying wealthy clients' demands for ostentatious houses. Notable examples include "Benvenuta" in Carlton, designed by Walter Scott Law in 1892 for a small-arms manufacturer. Roman-inspired, and now known as Medley Hall, a residential college, is another example, featuring intricate garlands, encrustations of floral motifs, and statues on the parapet, all crafted by Italian artisans.

=== Glass ===
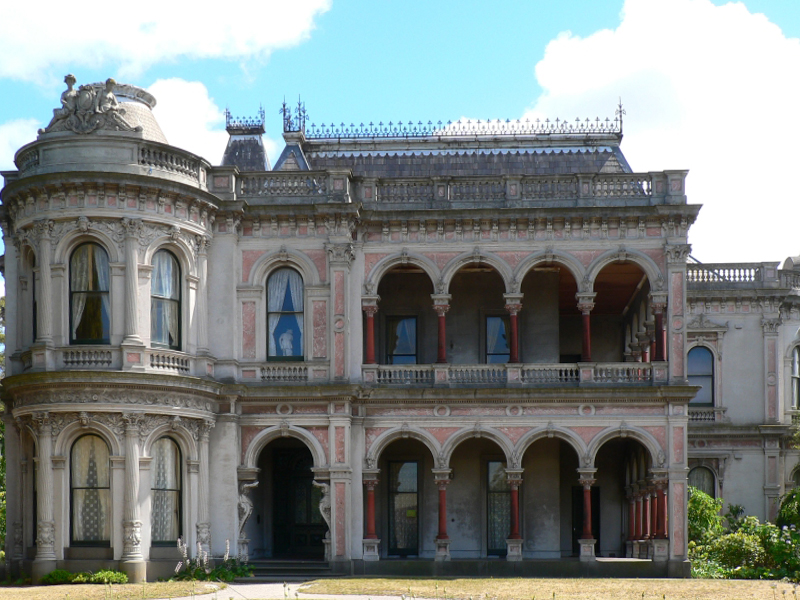
Labassa mansion in Caulfield (remodelling completed 1889)

During this era, coloured glass became a popular feature in private homes, adorning both modest terraces and grand mansions. The availability of relatively inexpensive glass due to the Industrial Revolution, its suitability as ballast on returning ships, and the public's inclination for ornamentation all contributed to its widespread usage. By the 1880s international exhibitions in Sydney (1879) and Melbourne (1880-81) had popularised sophisticated new products from manufacturing nations and the introduction of various types of specialty glass, adding a colourful element to the generally subdued tones of boom-style building materials. Painted and enameled decorative panels, etched ruby glass, and high-quality Victorian leadlights, featuring thick and deeply colored quarries and sparkling roundels, were incorporated into door settings, stairwells, and hallway windows. The role of the stained glass window is showcased in Labassa, an Italian-inspired villa in Caulfield North, constructed in 1890 for W. A. Robertson, a pastoralist and investor. Designed by J. A. B. Koch and again built by Italian craftsmen, the villa exhibited extensive sculptural ornamentation and extravagant use of stenciled decorations and stained glass.

== Architects ==
- George Henry Male Addison: The Albert Street Uniting Church, Brisbane, (1889); Cliveden Mansions, Spring Hill (1888); The villa Kirkston, built in 1888–89 at Windsor Extensive additions to Stanley Hall, Clayfield, (1889);The Mansions, 40 George Street, Brisbane (1889); Fernbrook, his home in Indooroopilly (c. 1889, demolished in the 1920s); Cumbooquepa, South Brisbane (1890); The Old Museum Building, Brisbane, (1891)
- James Birtwistle (1857–1939): Illawarra, Toorak (1889); Great Southern Hotel, Beaumaris (1889); Preston Town Hall (1895, uncompleted)
- Thomas James Crouch (1832 - 1889): Deloraine Terrace, Parkville, 1887; Melbourne General Post Office (design ultimately went to A. E. Johnson); Methodist Ladies College
- George De Lacy Evans: Marks’ Warehouses, 29 Niagara Lane, Melbourne (1887); Sum Kum Lee Building, Lt. Bourke St, (1888)
- Harry Browse Gibbs (1858–1918): George Hotel, Fitzroy Street, St Kilda (1886, corner section); Crossakiel, 26 Kooyongkoot Road., Hawthorn (1884-6)
- Norman Hitchcock (c. 1837–1918): Holcombe Terrace, Carlton; 70 Albert Street, East Melbourne; Victoria Buildings, 193–207 Smith Street, Fitzroy (1889); Melbournia Terrace, 1 - 13 Drummond Street,, Carlton
- Arthur Ebden Johnson: Melbourne General Post Office (additions 1887); Melbourne Athenaeum (1886); Eastern Hill Fire Station (1893)
- William Pitt: designs include: Premier Permanent Building Society 1882 (demolished); Melbourne Coffee Palace in 1882 (demolished in the 1960s); Princess Theatre; The Federal Coffee Palace (demolished in 1972); Olderfleet buildings; Old Safe Deposit Building; Old Rialto Building; Former Melbourne Stock Exchange; Grand Hotel, Yarra Glen
- Joseph Reed (c. 1823–1890): Royal Exhibition Building, 1880; Ormond College, Melbourne University (1881); Holy Trinity Church, East St Kilda (1882–1889); Old Pathology Building, Melbourne University (1885); Sacred Heart Church, St Kilda (1884); Lombard Building (15–17 Queen Street) (1887); Baldwin Spencer Building, Melbourne University (1887); Old Physics Conference Room and Gallery, Melbourne University (1888)
- Lloyd Tayler (1830–1900): Chevy Chase, 203 Were Street, Brighton (1881)
- Edward Twentyman (from 1882 – Twentyman and Askew) Cairns Memorial Church, East Melbourne (c1886), Colonial Sugar Refinery, Port Melbourne (c. 1886); Block Arcade, Collins Street (1890–93); Campi Buildings at 149–167 Queens Parade, Clifton Hill (1883)
- William Charles Vahland (1828–1915): Bendigo Town Hall (1885), Shamrock Hotel (1897)
- Charles Webb: Hotel Windsor, Royal Arcade, South Melbourne Town Hall, Tasma Terrace, and his own home at 6 Farleigh Grove are all listed on the Victorian Heritage Register.
- William Wolf: Lalor House, Richmond, 1888; Nathan’s Terrace, Flemington, 1888; Canterbury Mansions, Canterbury, 1889

== Demise ==
With a recession and the collapse of banks in 1893 and following that, the demise of numerous newly established companies, the building industry embraced a more modest style that reflected the prevailing sobriety.

The "Queen Anne" revival style emerged in deliberate contrast to the Boom Style, characterised by meticulously pointed red bricks and newly imported Marseilles-pattern roofing tiles made of terra-cotta, and abandoning the use of stucco. Grey slate was replaced with red tiles, while the folded M-shaped roof expanded to form a high, all-encompassing cap. Instead of formal symmetry, the plan and silhouette of buildings transformed into an assortment of irregular bays, dormers, porches, and spires, striving to achieve a "picturesque" appearance, and a more homely 'English' quality.

== Gallery ==
Further examples

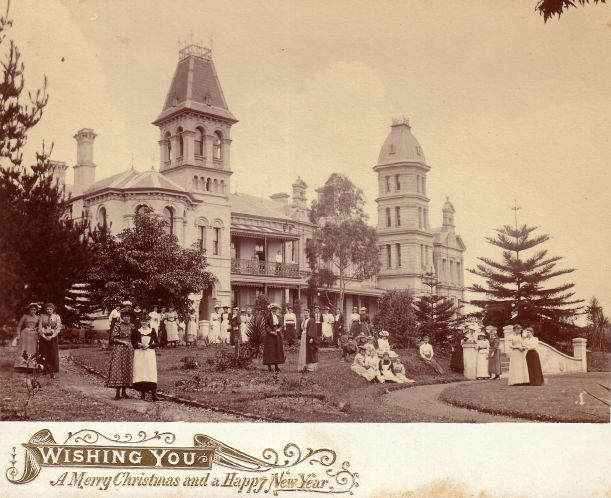
Shubra Hall and the Main School Building and students of the Presbyterian Ladies' College, Sydney, 1892.

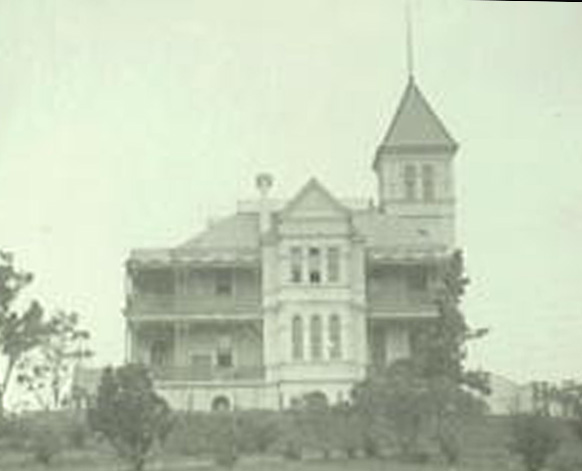
Studley Park, Camden circa 1900

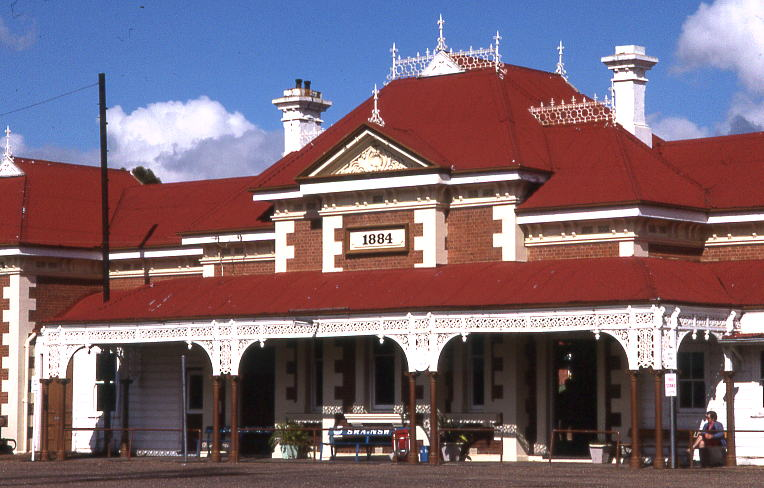
Mudgee railway station, architect John Whitton

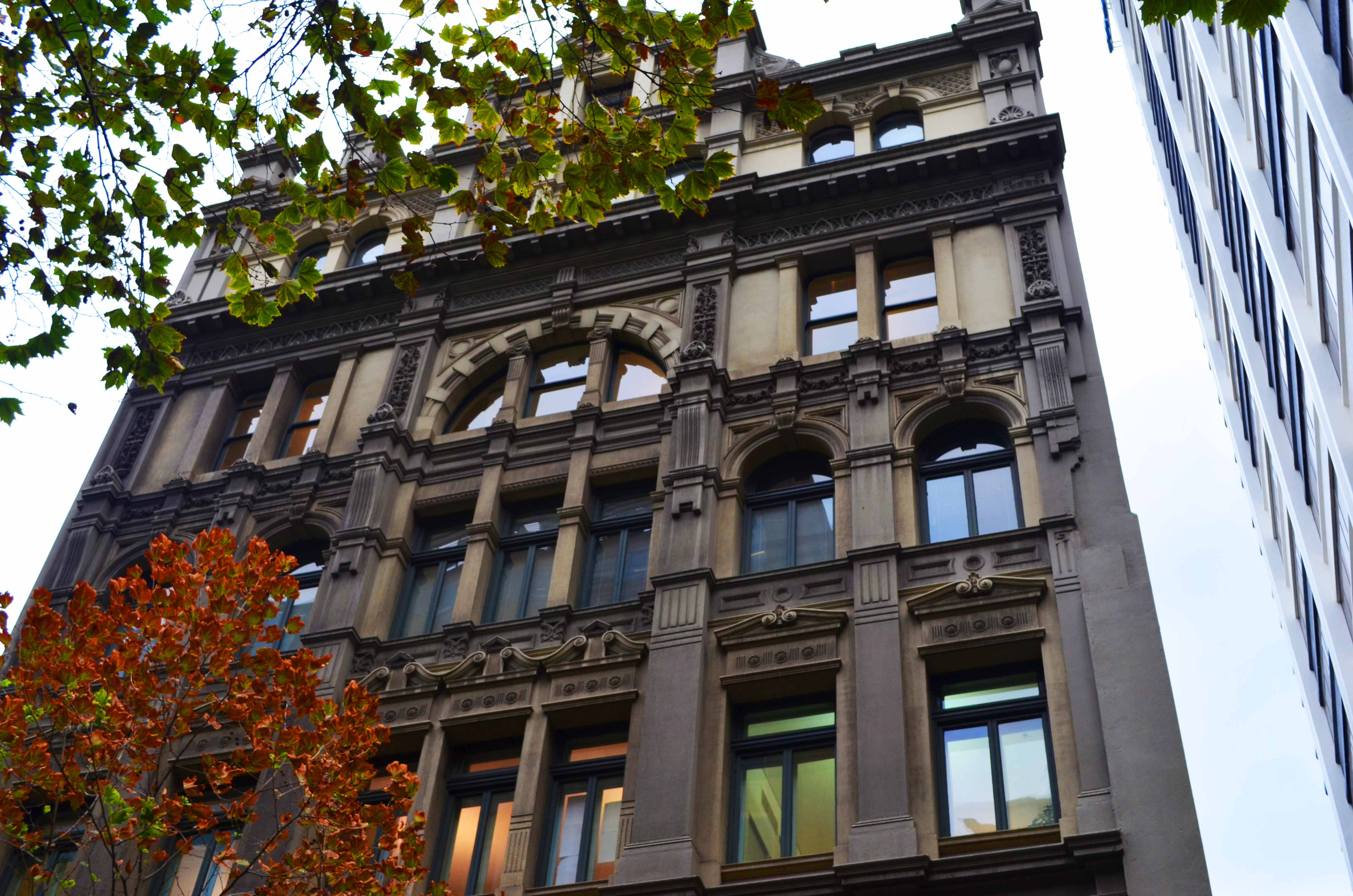
Lombard Building, Queen Street, Melbourne, 1890. Architects Balfour, Elliott & Co.

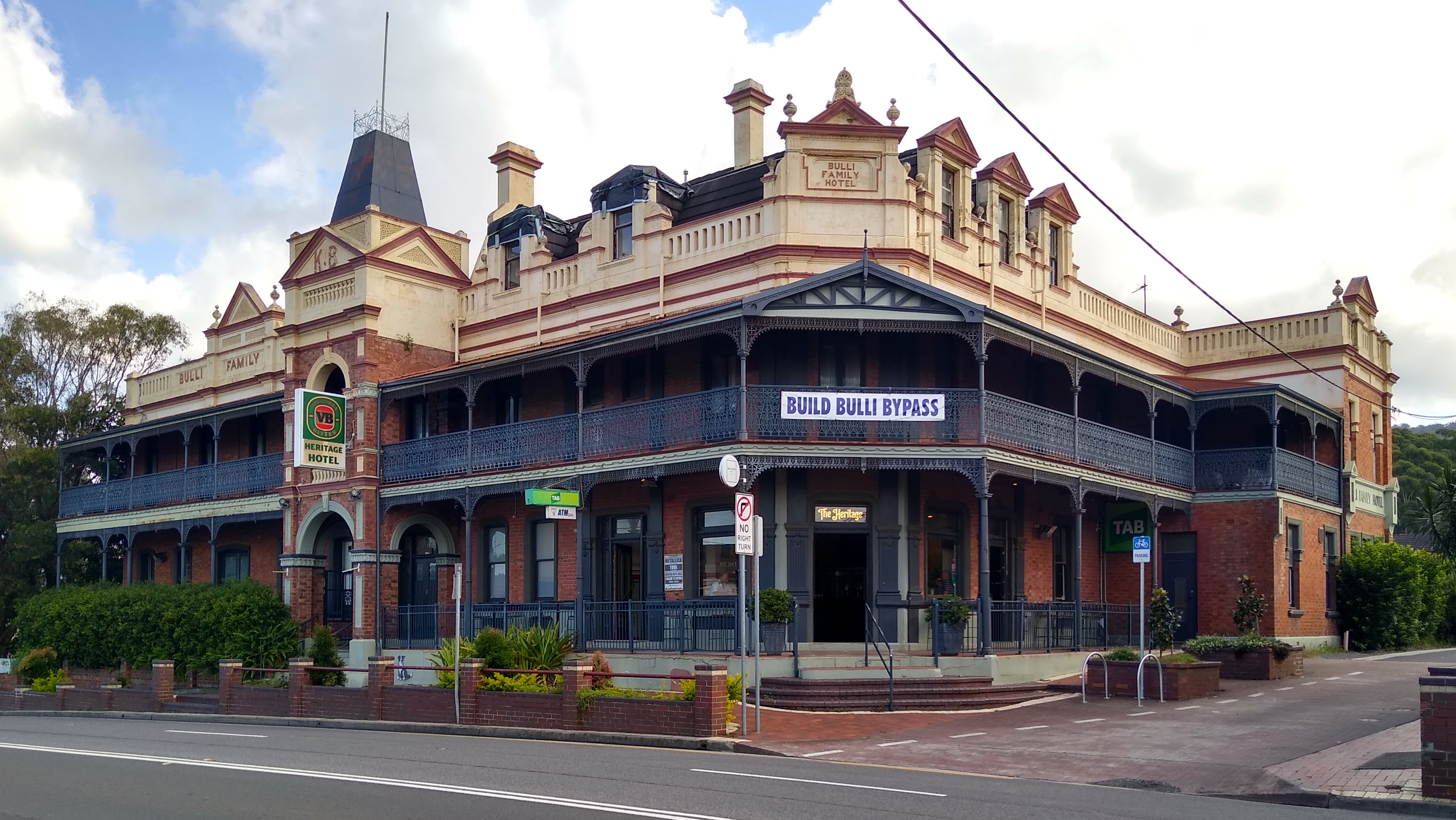
Heritage Hotel, Bulli, New South Wales, 1889. Kenwood and Kerle architects

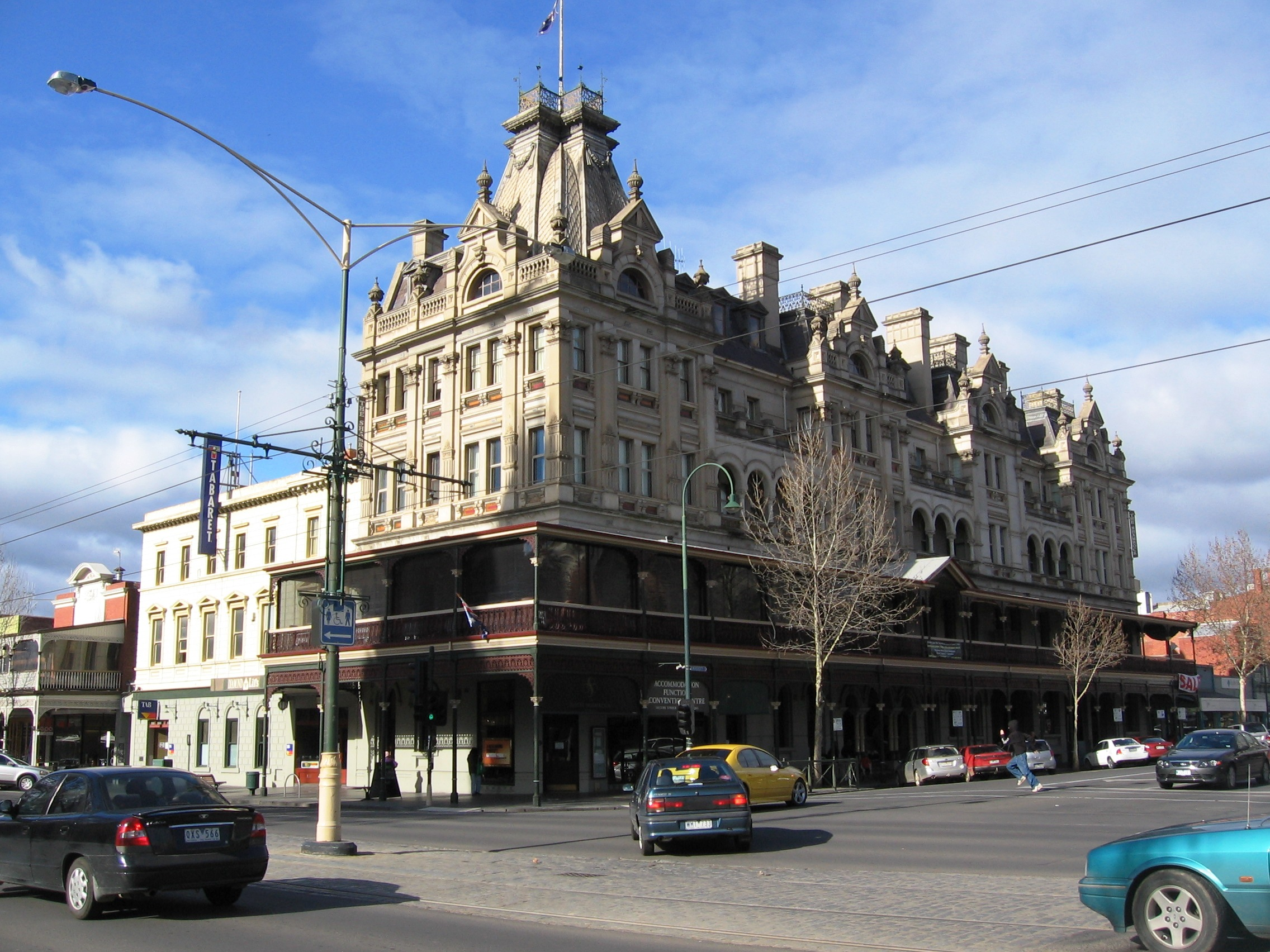
Shamrock Hotel, Bendigo, 1897. Designed by Phillip Kennedy

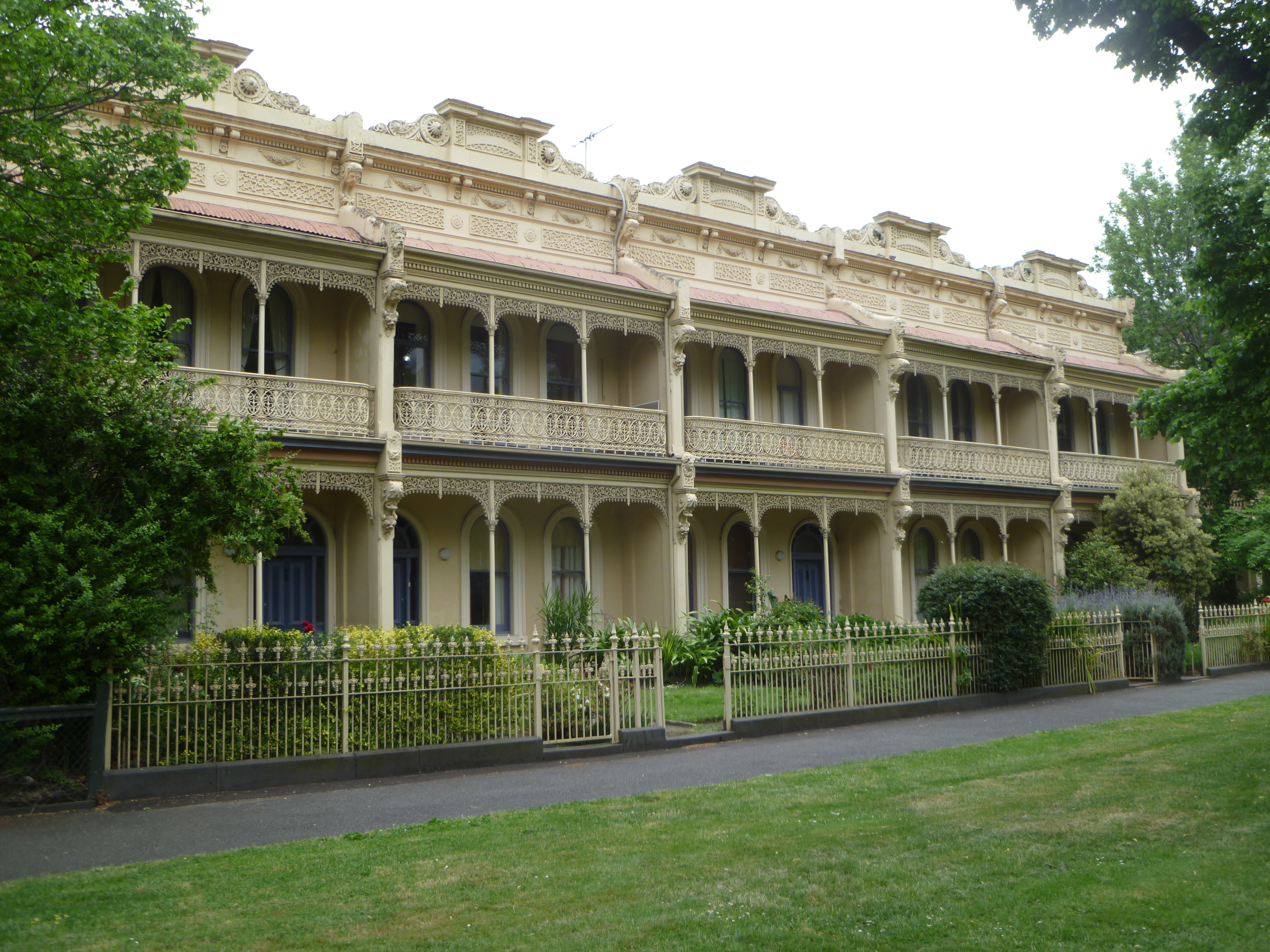
Trinity Terrace, Royal Parade, Parkville, Melbourne

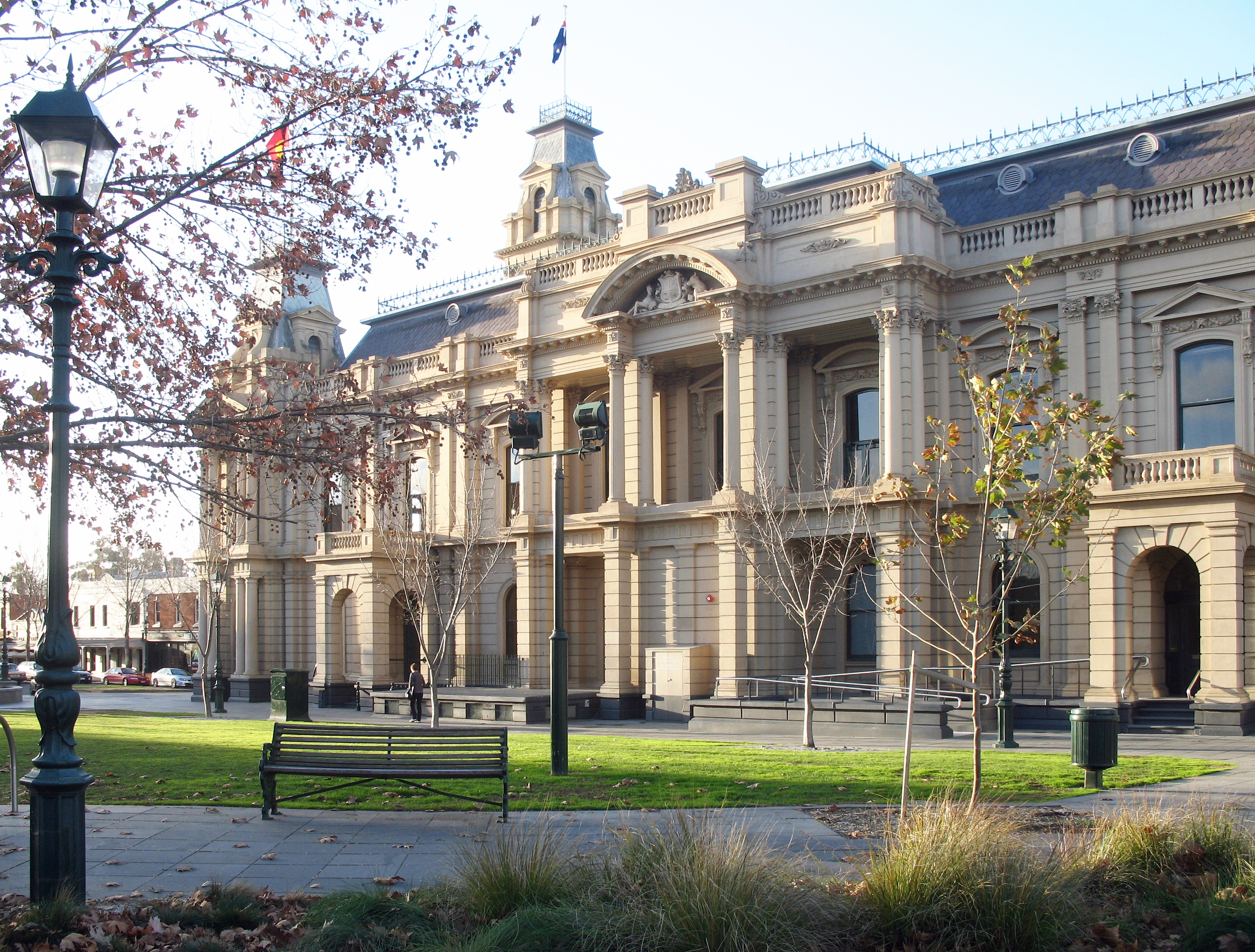
Bendigo Town Hall, architect William Vahland, 1885

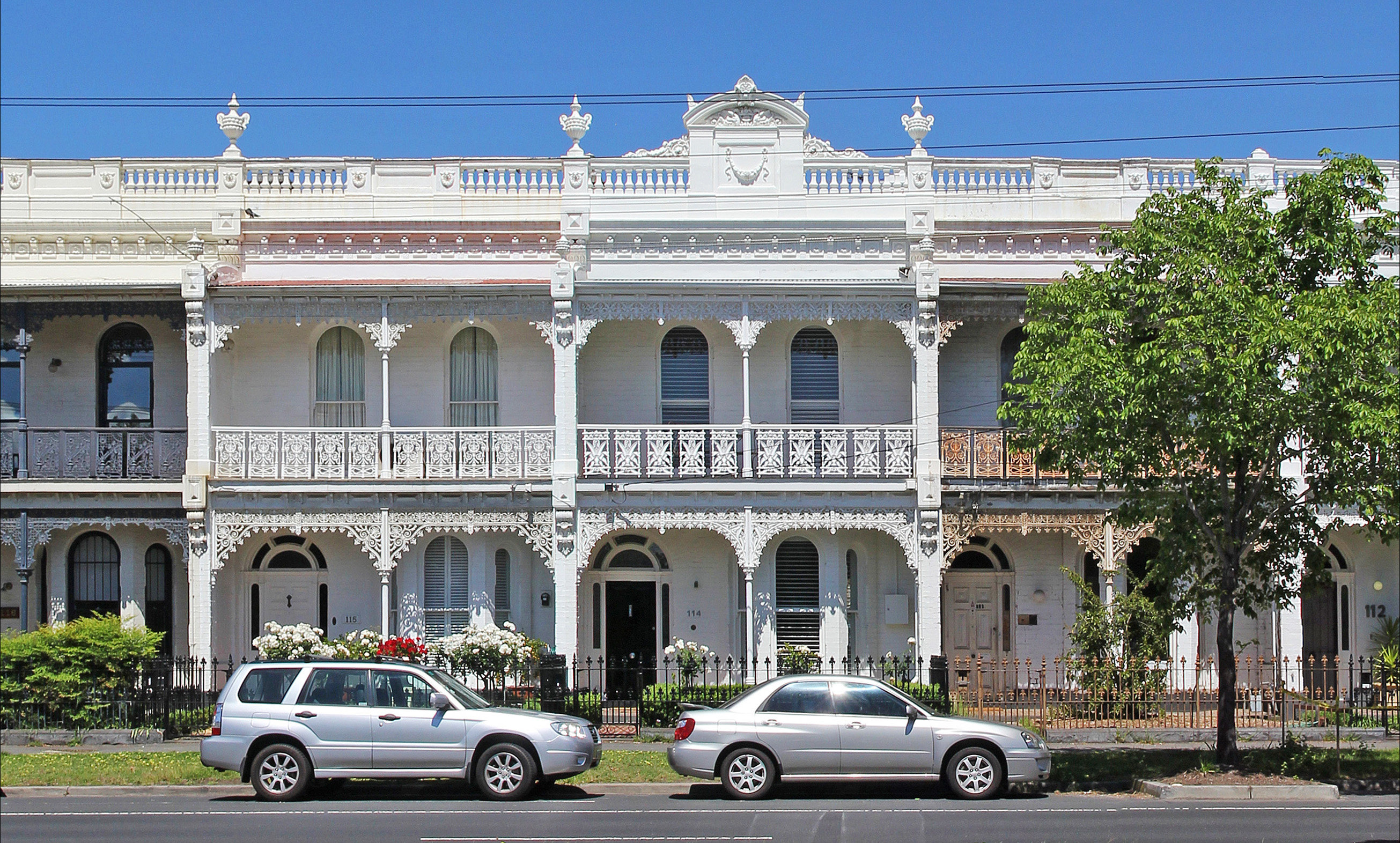
Victorian terrace on Canterbury Road, Middle Park

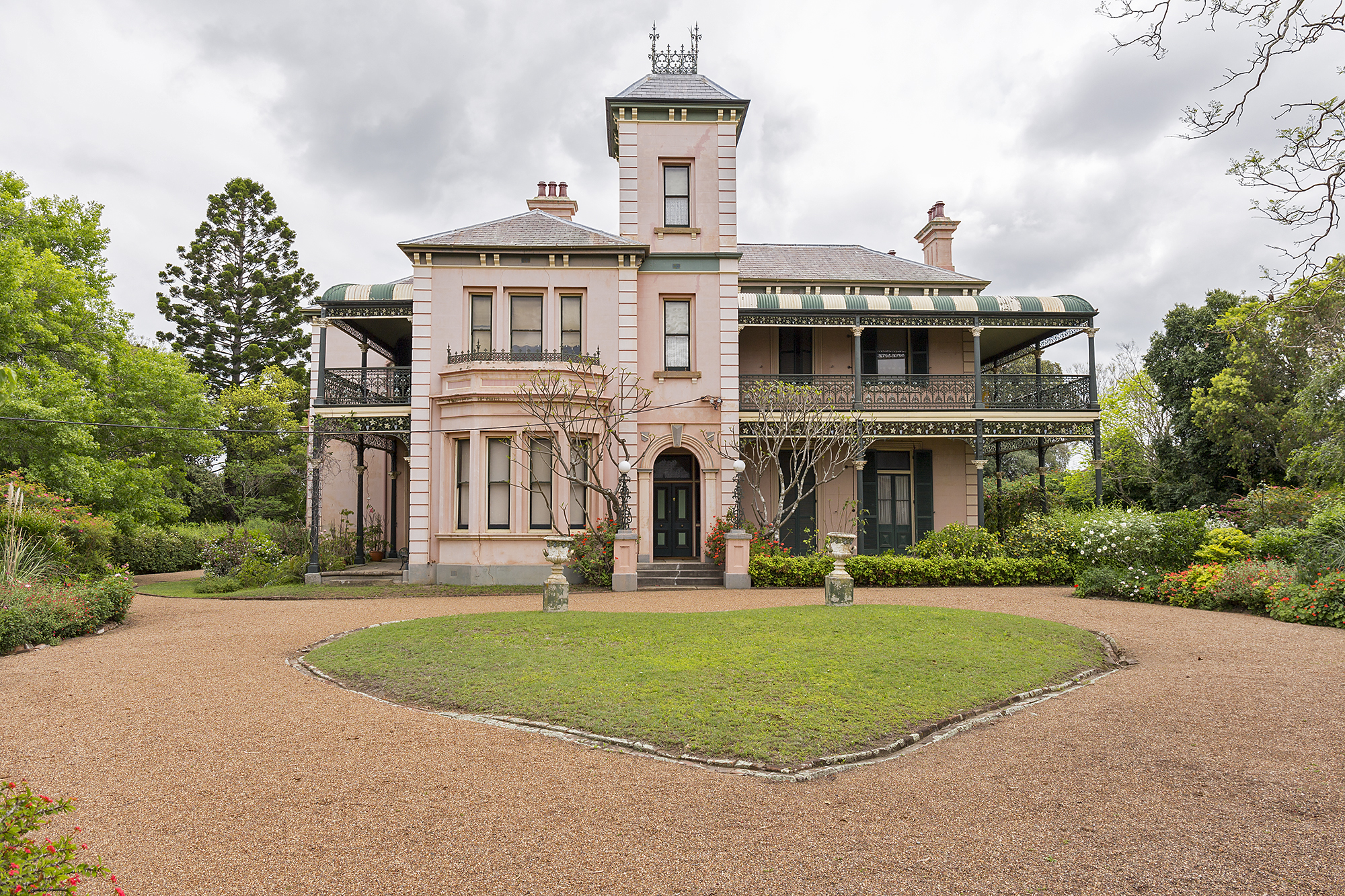
Cintra House, Maitland, architect John Wiltshire Pender, 1889

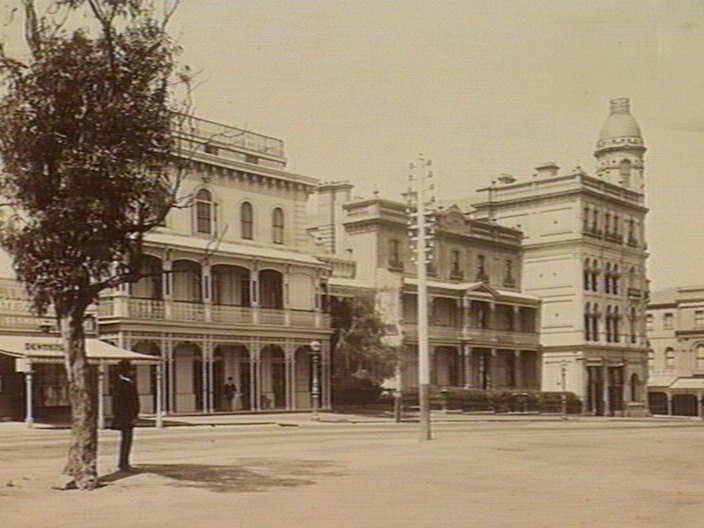
Fitzroy Street, St Kilda in 1890

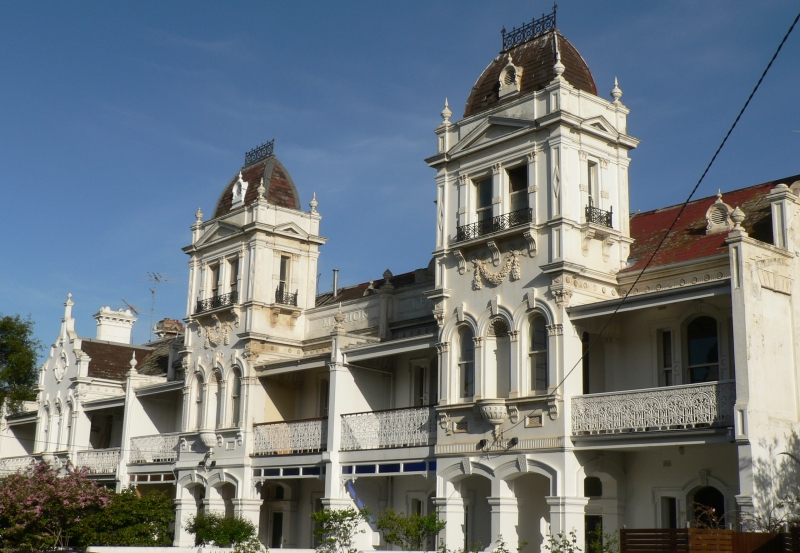
Marion Terrace, St Kilda

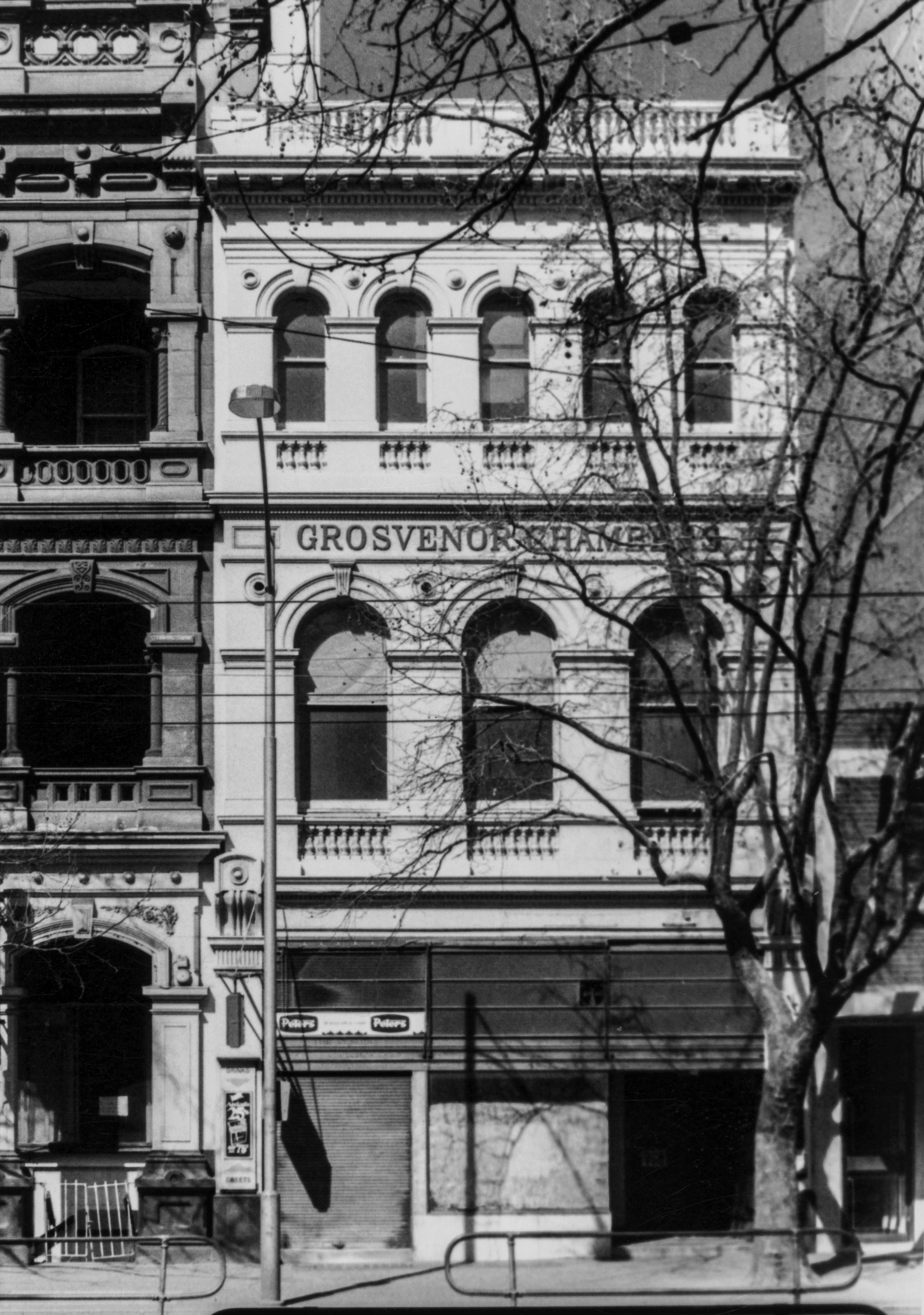
Grosvenor Chambers. Architects Oakden, Addison and Kemp, 1888

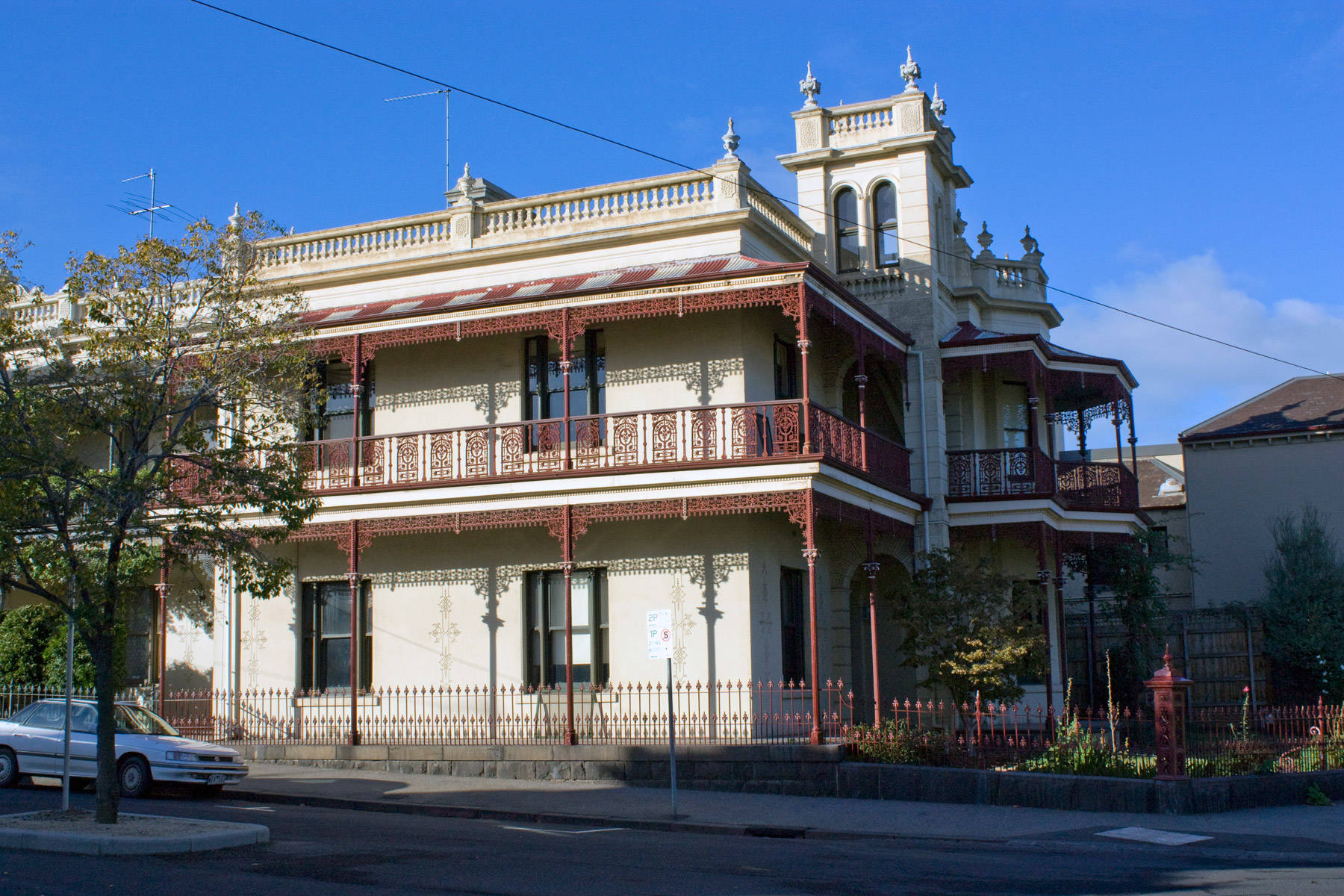
"Wardlow", Parkville, Victoria, 1888

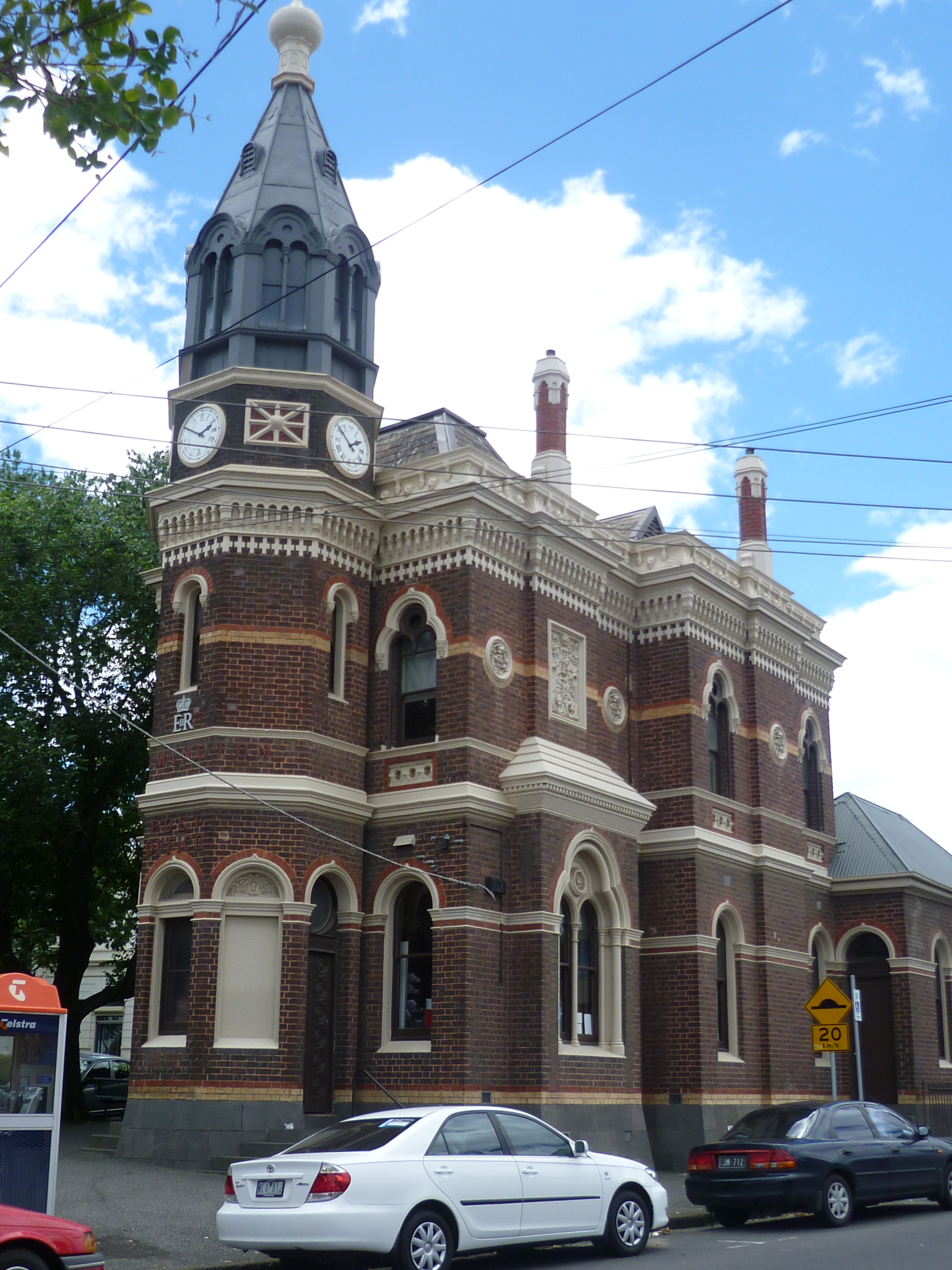
Flemington Post Office. Architect J. R. Brown, 1888

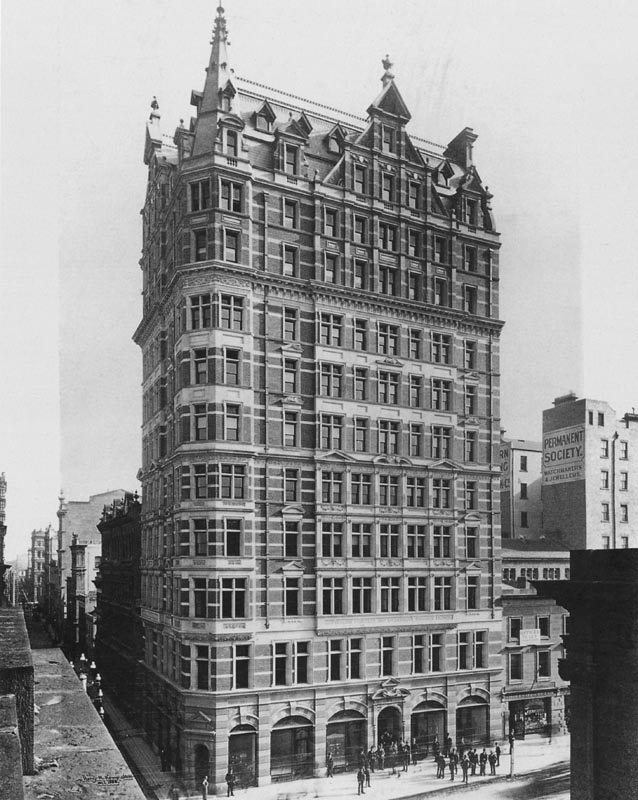
APA Building, Melbourne, Oakden, Addison & Kemp 1889

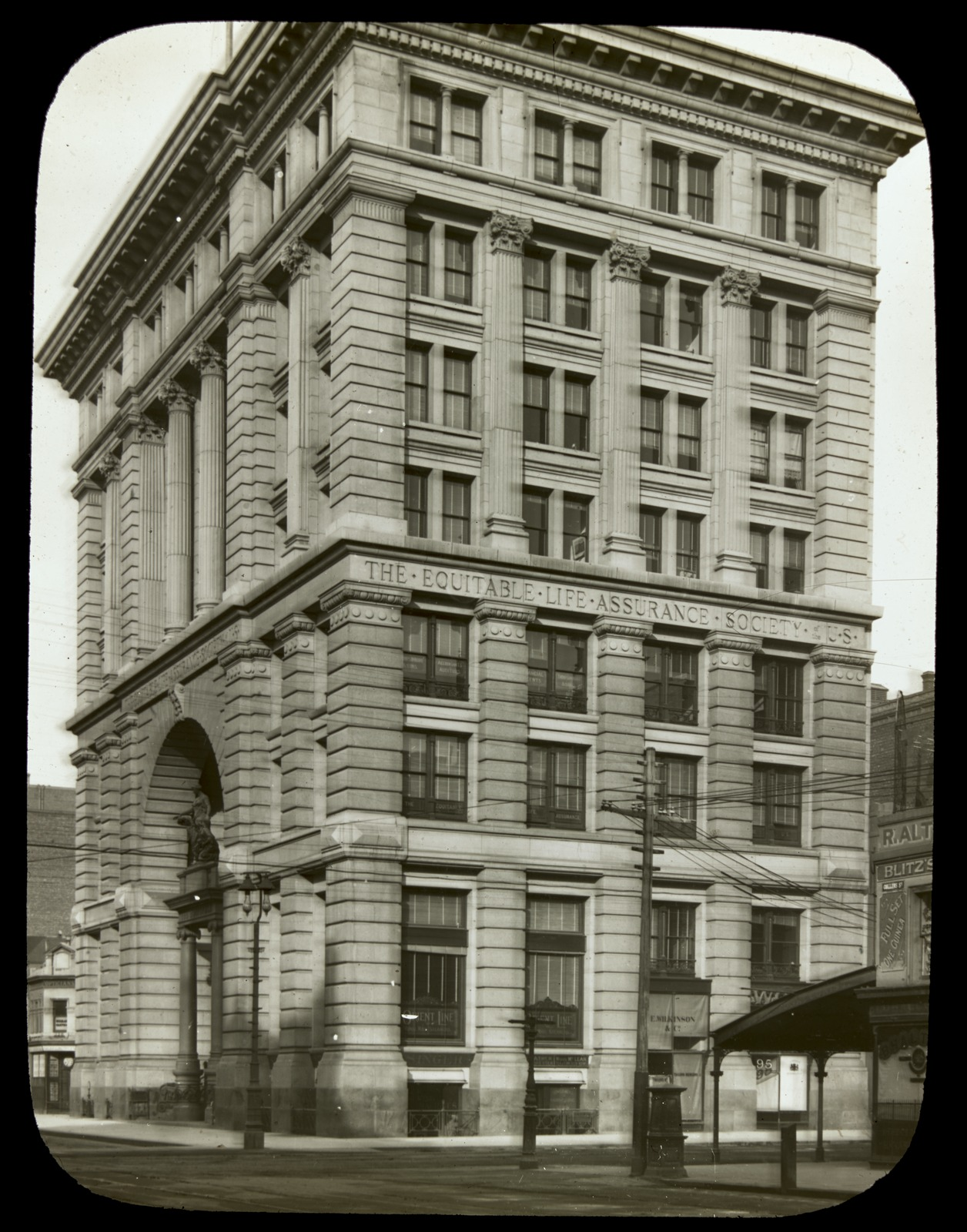
Equitable Building, Collins Street, architect Edward Raht, 1896

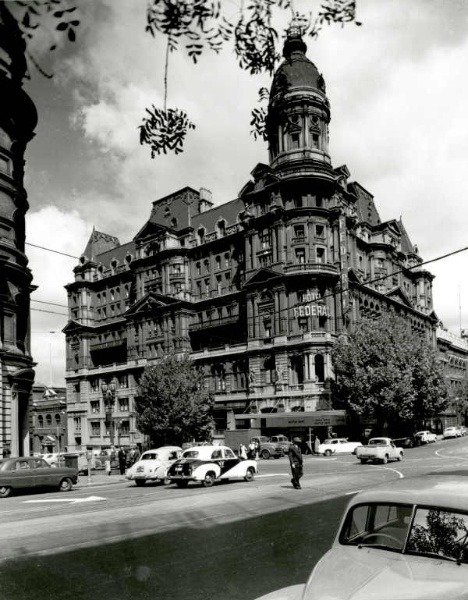
Federal Coffee Palace, Melbourne, designed by Ellerker & Kilburn and William Pitt, 1888

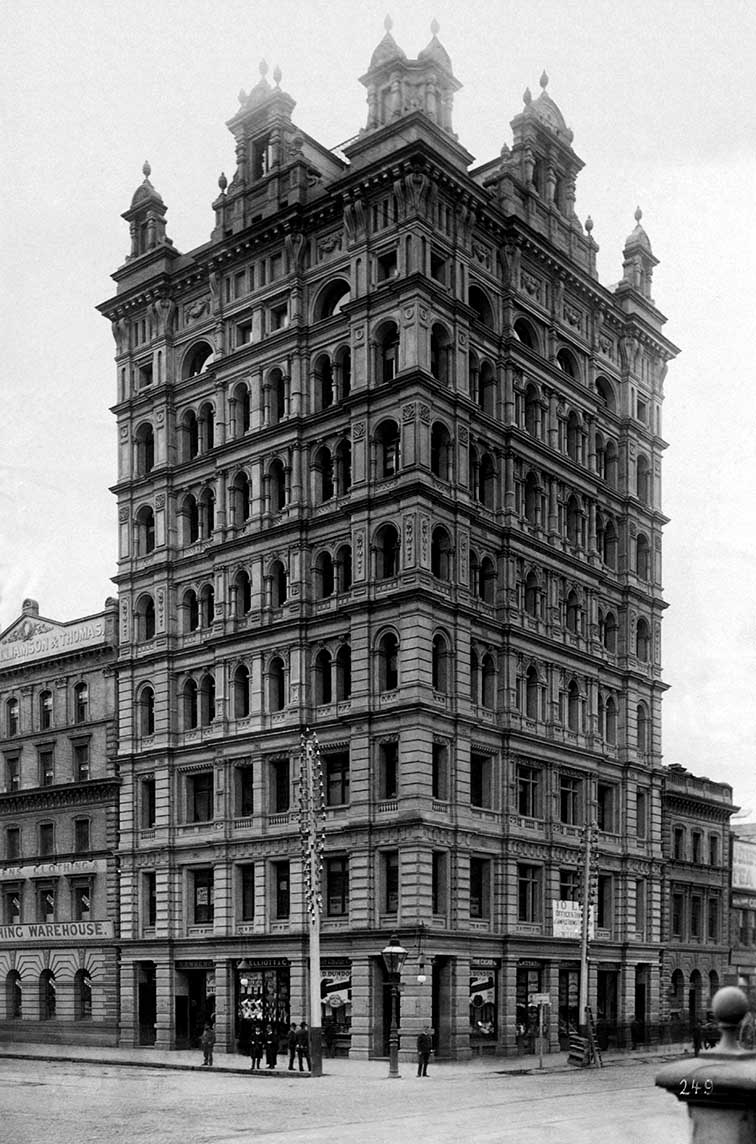
Fink's Building, Melbourne. Architects Twentyman & Askew, 1888

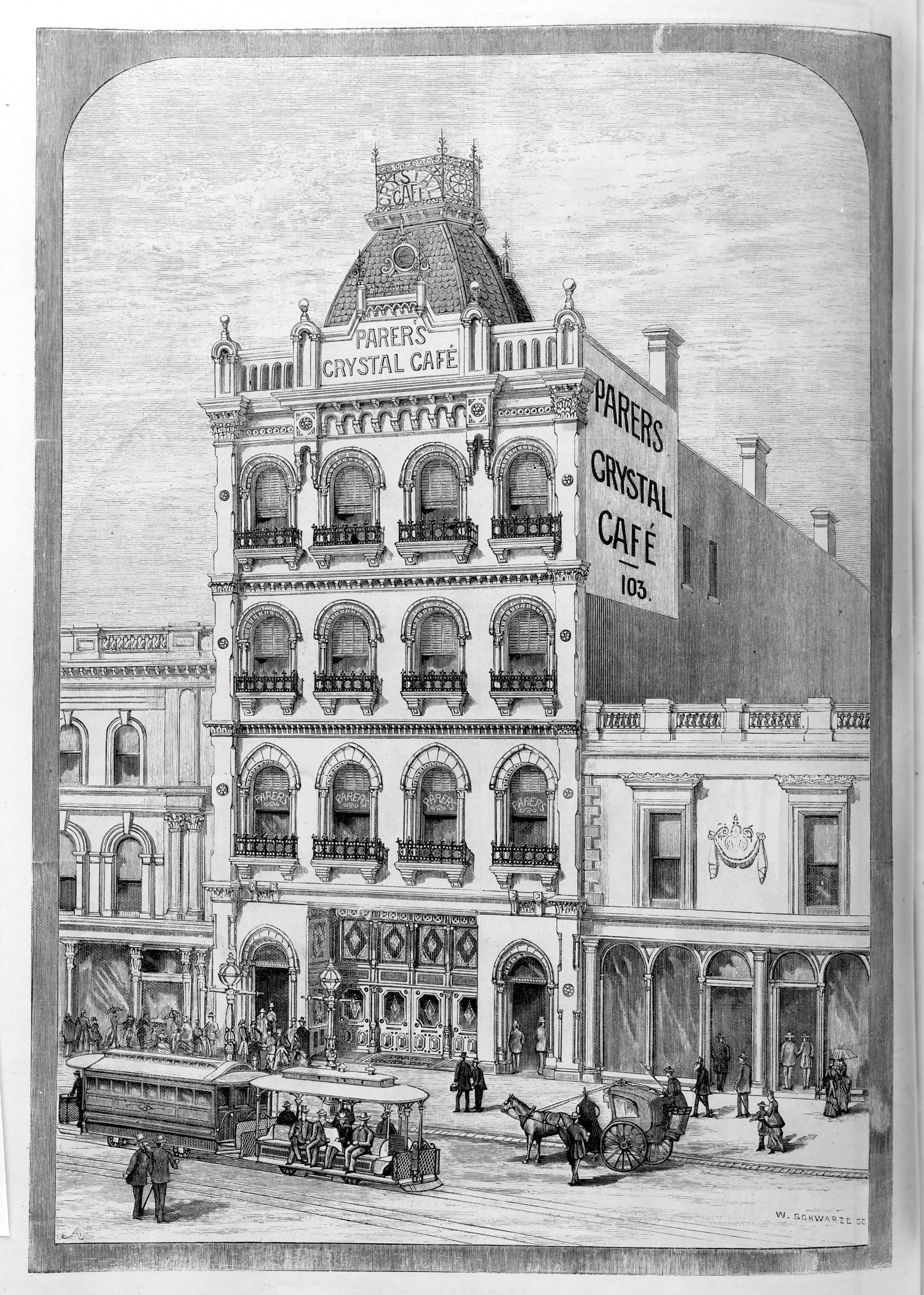
Parer's Crystal Cafe, Bourke Street, Melbourne 1886

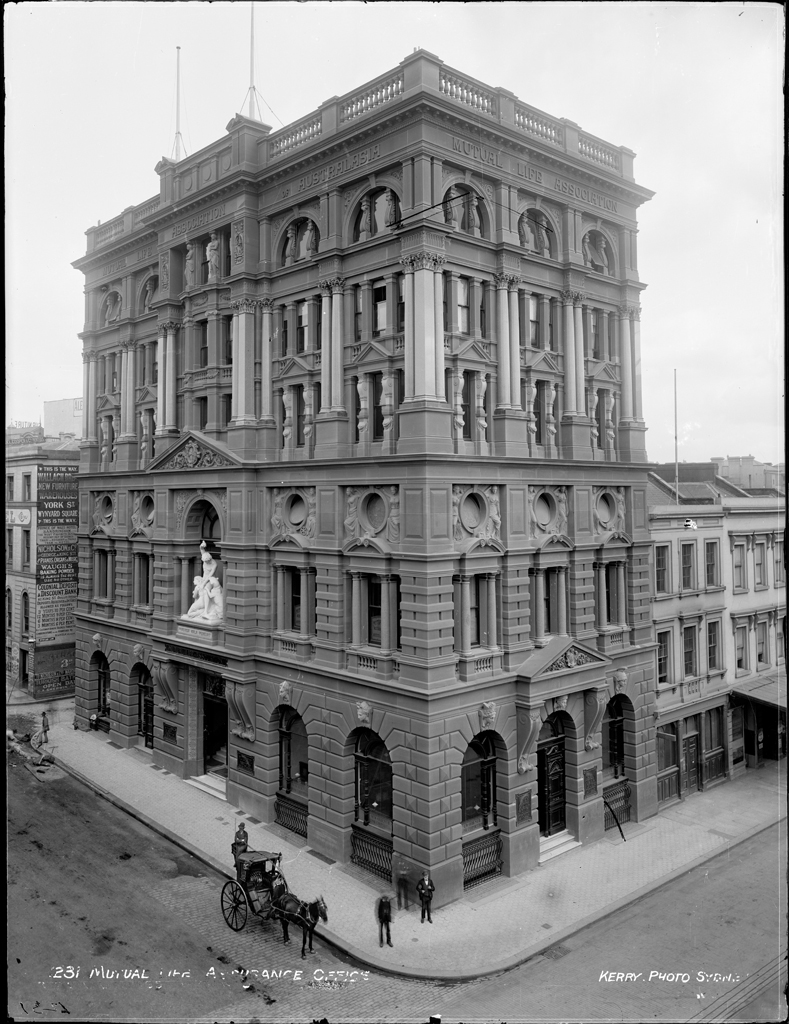
The Mutual Life Building, Sydney, Sulman & Power, 1891

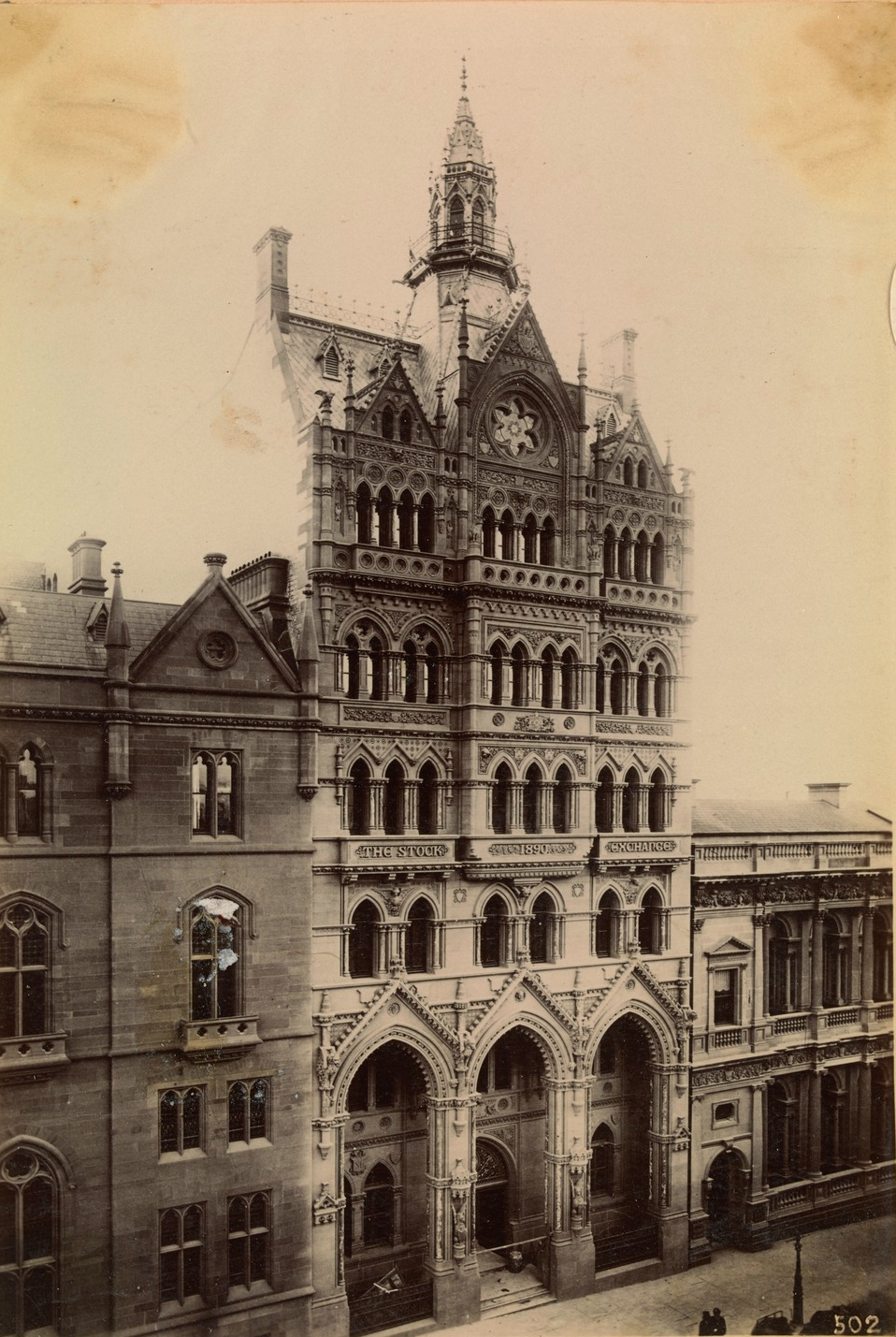
Former Melbourne Stock Exchange building, 1890, now ANZ Bank offices
