= John Medley (vice-chancellor) =

Sir John Medley

Vice-Chancellor, University of Melbourne
- In office 1 July 1938 – 1 July 1951
- Preceded by: Sir Raymond Priestly
- Succeeded by: Sir George Paton

Personal details
- Born: John Dudley Gibbs Medley; 19 April 1891 Oxford, England
- Died: 26 September 1962 (aged 71) Harkaway, Victoria, Australia
- Education: New College, Oxford
- Awards: Honorary D.C.L. (University of Oxford) (1948)

Sir John Dudley Gibbs Medley was a British-Australian businessman and administrator. He held the position of Vice-Chancellor at the University of Melbourne from 1938 to 1951.

== Biography ==
=== Early life ===
Medley was born on 19 April 1891 in Oxford, England to Dudley Julius Medley and Isabel Alice Medley (née Gibbs). He was the eldest of seven children.

=== Military Service ===
Medley was commissioned in 1914 in the 6th (Glamorgan) Battalion, Welsh Regiment. He later served as a railway transport officer in France and Belgium.

=== Move to Australia ===
Medley joined the family firm of Antony Gibbs & Sons, London, in 1920. He was sent to Australia to manage the Adelaide branch from 1922 to 1925, after which he transferred to the Sydney head office, known as Gibbs, Bright & Co. His time there ended prematurely. In 1931, he was appointed headmaster of Tudor House, an Anglican preparatory school at Moss Vale, New South Wales, which he ran alongside his wife Emmeline Mary (Molly) Medley.

=== The University of Melbourne ===
Medley was appointed Vice-Chancellor of the University of Melbourne on 1 July 1938, and oversaw the administration and leadership of the university through World War II. He was chairman of the Vice-Chancellors' Committee, which was responsible for the Universities Commission and the Commonwealth Reconstruction Training Scheme.

He was knighted in 1948.

== Legacy ==
=== Buildings ===
In 1971, the John Medley Building at the University of Melbourne, Parkville Campus was named in Medley's honour.

Medley was a member of the Eugenics Society of Victoria, an organisation which, among other things, justified the White Australia Policy and the removal of Aboriginal children from their parents. In the light of that, students at both Melbourne and Monash universities campaigned in the mid-2010s to rename the John Medley Building at Melbourne University and the John Medley Library at the Clayton campus of Monash University.

The Monash campaign was successful and the library was renamed the Student Union Recreational Library (Surly).

Medley Hall, now Wilam Hall, the smallest residential college of the University of Melbourne, was named in Medley's honour in 1955. In 2024 it was renamed to Wilam Hall. This name was gifted to college by the Wurundjeri Woi Wurrung Cultural Heritage Aboriginal Corporation, and means 'home' or 'shelter' in the local Woi Wurrung language. The official Wilam Hall website notes that this decision acknowledged that "many students...had been deeply affected by the name of the College given Sir John Medley's membership of the Eugenics Society of Victoria."

=== In art ===
A bronze medal portrait of Medley created by prominent Hungarian-Australian sculptor Andor Mészáros in 1940 is held in the Museums Victoria Collection.
