= Walter Law =

Walter Law may refer to:

- Walter Law (actor) (1876–1940), American actor
- Walter W. Law Jr. (1871–1958), American lawyer and politician
- Walter W. Law (1837–1924), American businessman, founder of Briarcliff Manor
- Walter Scott Law, English-born Australian architect
