= Wardlow, Parkville, Melbourne =

Building in Melbourne, Australia

Coordinates: 37.79373°S 144.95662°E

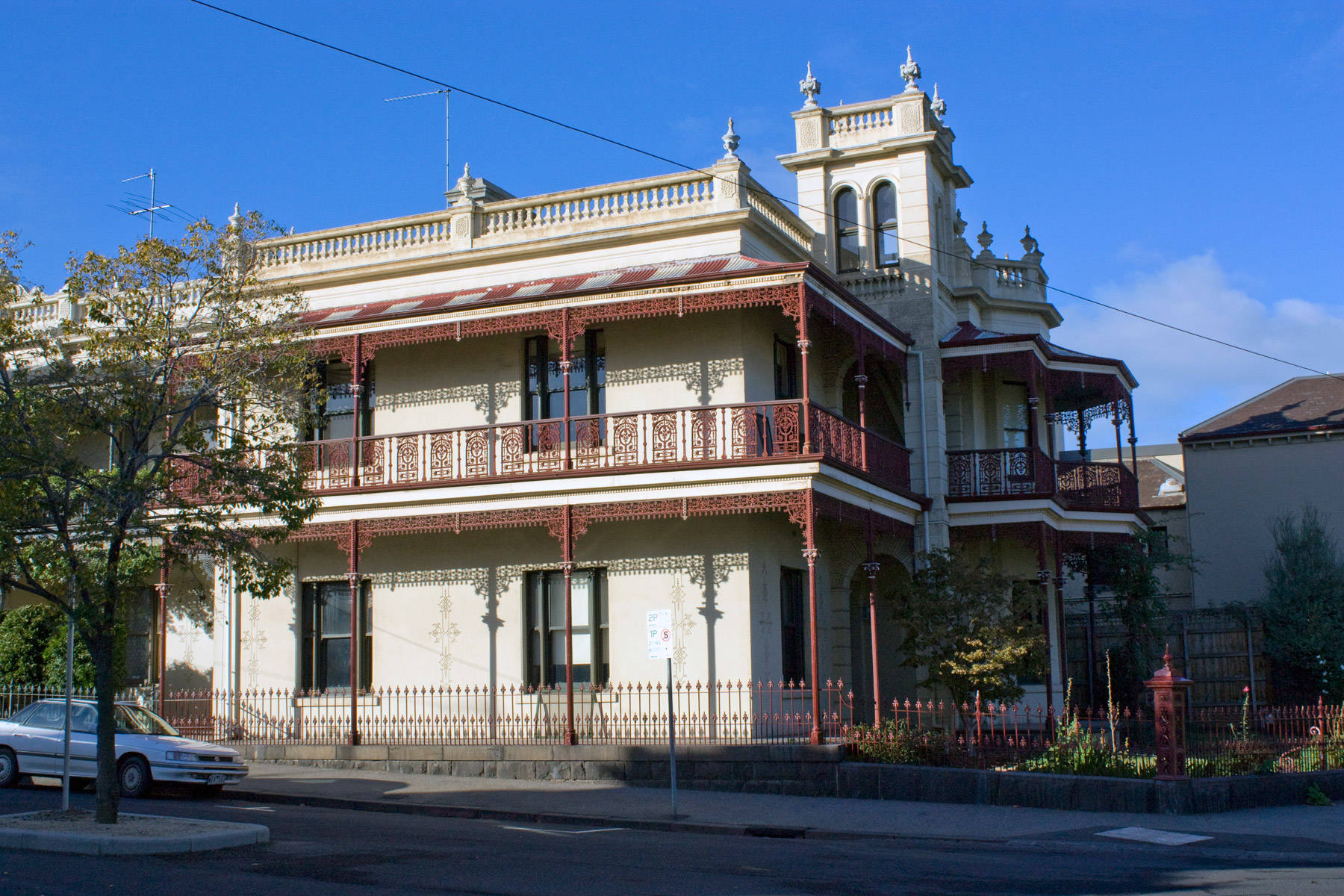
Wardlow, Parkville

Wardlow is an Australian house of historical significance located in the Melbourne suburb of Parkville. It was built in 1888 by John Boyes and is considered to be a fine example of the boom style Italianate architecture of that time, and is listed by the Victorian National Trust.

Wardlow has been used as the exterior of Phryne Fisher's house in the ABC's period drama Miss Fisher's Murder Mysteries.

== Ownership ==
=== John and Mary Boyes ===
John Boyes, who built Wardlow, was born in Sheffield, England in 1833. He was the son of William Boyes, a carpenter, and Sarah Rollinson. Around 1850, Boyes junior became an apprentice saw maker, the same occupation as his brother, William.

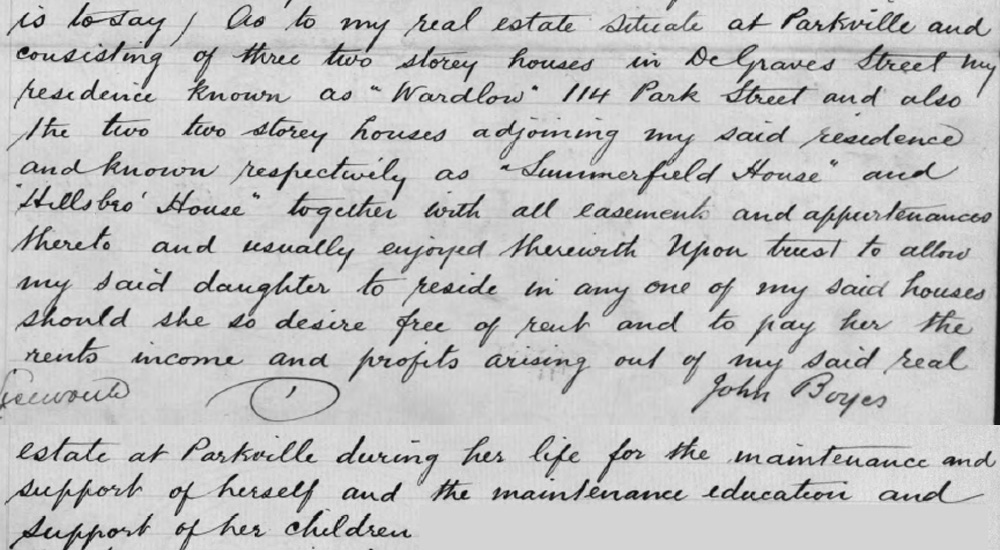
Extract from the Will of John Boyes relating to Wardlow.

Around 1860, John Boyes migrated to Australia and resided for some years at Heathcote, Victoria. In 1863 he married Mary Hill, who was the only daughter of Isaac Hill. She had also migrated from England. The couple lived for two years in Heathcote. In 1865, John’s brother William migrated to Melbourne with his wife Emma and their children. At this time, John moved to Melbourne and the brothers commenced their ironmongery business, trading as the Boyes Brothers. They are listed in the 1866 Victorian Post Office Directory as having a saw making establishment in Russell Street, Melbourne. The business flourished and they expanded their activities into the importation of hardware. They eventually owned the four buildings which still exist in at 213 to 219 Russell Street, now listed as places of historical significance.

In 1879 John built two terrace houses at 110 and 112 Park Drive, Parkville, which are adjacent to Wardlow . He and his family lived at No. 110 until 1888, when he built Wardlow, and the three adjoining terrace houses behind in Degraves Street. These six houses were the basis of Boyes' residential real estate and all still exist today and are listed on the National Trust (Victoria) heritage register.

John and Mary Boyes had four children, one of whom was Mary Elizabeth Boyes (born in 1868). In 1892, Mary Elizabeth married the Reverend Frederick Arthur Booth and the couple had four children. In 1901, Reverend Booth was struck by a train and Mary Elizabeth was left a widow. She came to live in Wardlow with her father, who was now a widower as his wife had died in the previous year. She and her four children lived there until Boyes' death in 1910. In his will, Boyes made special provision for his daughter, Mary, and her children, as they had no father to provide for them. He left them the six houses in trust.

=== Mary Elizabeth Booth and her children ===
Mary Elizabeth Booth lived with her four children at Wardlow for the next twenty years. Three of her children left in the 1930s when they married. One of her daughters, Mary Eileen Booth, remained single for some time after and she lived at Wardlow with her mother. In 1950, at the age of 55, Mary Eileen Booth married Samuel Frederick Arthur Fripp, the son of Samuel Fripp, a director of The Herald and The Weekly Times, and the owner of Villa Alba, a large mansion in Kew.

=== Mary Eileen and Samuel Fripp ===
After she was married in 1950, Mary Eileen continued to live with her mother at Wardlow. Samuel, her new husband, also lived with them. Her mother died in 1959, so Mary and Samuel Fripp lived together at the house for another thirteen years. Samuel died in 1972, and Mary sold the house three years later, in 1975.

=== Kimberley Kitching and Andrew Landeryou ===
Kimberley Kitching and Andrew Landeryou purchased Wardlow for $1,175,000 in 2001. According to The Sydney Morning Herald, "the pair would host parties at home that guests still compare to the lavish soirées in F. Scott Fitzgerald's novel The Great Gatsby". The couple subsequently ran into financial difficulties, and after Kitching was declared bankrupt in 2005 the house was sold to clear her debts.

== See also ==
- List of heritage listed buildings in Melbourne
