= Kimberley Kitching =

Australian politician, lawyer, and trade unionist (1970–2022)

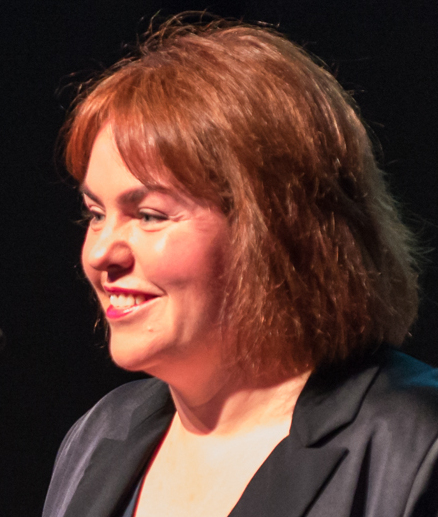
- Kitching in 2019

Senator for Victoria
- In office 25 October 2016 – 10 March 2022
- Preceded by: Stephen Conroy
- Succeeded by: Jana Stewart

Personal details
- Born: Kimberley Jane Elizabeth Kitching; 16 February 1970 Brisbane, Queensland, Australia
- Died: 10 March 2022 (aged 52) Strathmore, Victoria, Australia
- Party: Labor
- Spouse: Andrew Landeryou (m. 2000)
- Relatives: Bill Landeryou (father-in-law)
- Education: University of Queensland
- Website: www.kimberleykitching.com.au

Kimberley Jane Elizabeth Kitching (16 February 1970 – 10 March 2022) was an Australian politician, lawyer, and trade unionist. A member of the Labor Party, she was a Senator for Victoria from October 2016 until her death.

== Early life ==
Kitching was born in Brisbane, the daughter of Bill and Leigh Kitching. She grew up in the suburb of St Lucia, where she was a childhood friend of Chloe Shorten. Her father was a chemistry professor and during her youth the family spent time in England, Spain, France, Germany, and the United States as her father received academic postings. Kitching completed her schooling at Brisbane Girls Grammar School and then studied arts and law at the University of Queensland. She joined Young Labor as a student.

== Pre-political career ==
Kitching was admitted as a solicitor by the Supreme Court of Queensland. She moved to Melbourne in 1995. In the private sector, she worked for LookSmart before it was listed on the Nasdaq Stock Market, IQ Media (the company operated by her husband Andrew Landeryou) and Drake International, where she was the head of Government and Corporate Relations.

From December 2012, Kitching worked as the General Manager of the Victorian No. 1 Branch of the Health Services Union, leaving after a few years. In 2014, she was called to give evidence to the Royal Commission into trade union governance and corruption relating to her time with the Health Services Union.

In 2015 a vice president of the Fair Work Commission found that Kitching had illegally completed testing on behalf of other union officials to gain right of entry permits.

== Political career ==
Kitching was involved in Victorian Labor politics for some time, including being vice-president of the party's Victorian Branch. She was a Melbourne City Councillor in the early 2000s, and was a senior adviser to several ministries in the government of Labor premier Steve Bracks, as well as to John Lenders, the treasurer in the Brumby government.

In the 2013 Australian federal election, Kitching made a bid for Labor pre-selection for the Victorian electorates of Lalor and Gellibrand. Her bid was unsuccessful due to opposition from within the party, including from Stephen Conroy.

=== Senator (2016–2022) ===
On 13 October 2016, Kitching won pre-selection to fill the Victorian Senate seat vacated by Stephen Conroy's resignation on 30 September. Kitching's pre-selection was supported by her close friend, Opposition Leader Bill Shorten, and by the Labor Right. Shorten's support for Kitching generated tension in the party with frontbencher and former Deputy Prime Minister Anthony Albanese refusing to support her pre-selection, and legal affairs spokesperson Mark Dreyfus threatening to resign from his position in the shadow cabinet, although he did not carry out the threat.

Kitching was formally chosen as a replacement Senator by a joint sitting of the Parliament of Victoria on 25 October 2016, and sworn in on 7 November 2016.

After the 2019 election, Kitching was included in Anthony Albanese's shadow ministry as Shadow Assistant Minister for Government Accountability. She was also made Deputy Manager of Opposition Business in the Senate.

In February 2022, one month before her death, Kitching used parliamentary privilege to suggest to the head of the Australian Security Intelligence Organisation that Chau Chak Wing was the wealthy businessman behind an alleged Chinese plot to interfere in Australian elections to install politicians sympathetic to the Chinese Communist Party.

=== Positions ===
Kitching criticised the Victorian state ALP government for its support of China's global Belt and Road Initiative, saying it "should not have entered into an agreement with the Chinese government on the Belt and Road Initiative—it is bad policy and bad optics." In June 2020 she was announced as a founding member of the Inter-Parliamentary Alliance on China. In an interview on ABC radio, she said the alliance of 13 democratic nations was to see that:

...our rules based order is protected. There’s a great desire amongst the group to examine human rights issues. I think Western liberal democracies probably hoped that China was heading down a more liberal and democratic path. But I think when President Xi became president in 2013, that became a fainter and fainter hope.

As of 2022 Kitching was deputy chair of Parliamentary Friends of Israel. In February 2022, she and chair Eric Abetz issued a joint statement rejecting an Amnesty International report's "attempts to equate Israel’s efforts to the abhorrent historical practice of apartheid in South Africa".

Kitching was a proponent of Magnitsky-style legislation in Australia. She had introduced a private member's bill in August 2021 before the government introduced its own bill in November 2021.

== Personal life ==
Kitching was married to Andrew Landeryou, previously a well-known political blogger; her father-in-law Bill Landeryou was a state government minister in Victoria. The couple married in 2000 after meeting at a Labor fundraising night in country New South Wales. In 2001, the couple purchased Wardlow, a heritage-listed mansion in Parkville, Melbourne. The couple separated due to financial difficulties in the mid-2000s, and Kitching filed for bankruptcy in 2005, selling Wardlow to clear her debts; the bankruptcy was annulled in 2006. They did not divorce and later resumed their relationship.

=== Death and aftermath ===
Kitching died from a suspected heart attack in the Melbourne suburb of Strathmore, on 10 March 2022, at the age of 52. Following her death, allegations emerged that Kitching had reportedly complained about bullying by Labor's Senate leadership team, consisting of Penny Wong, Kristina Keneally and Katy Gallagher. The leadership team denied the allegations and all were present at Kitching's funeral. Labor leader Anthony Albanese said Kitching had made no official complaint about the matter, and said he would not hold an inquiry into the claims.
