= Jana Stewart =

Australian politician

Senator Jana Stewart
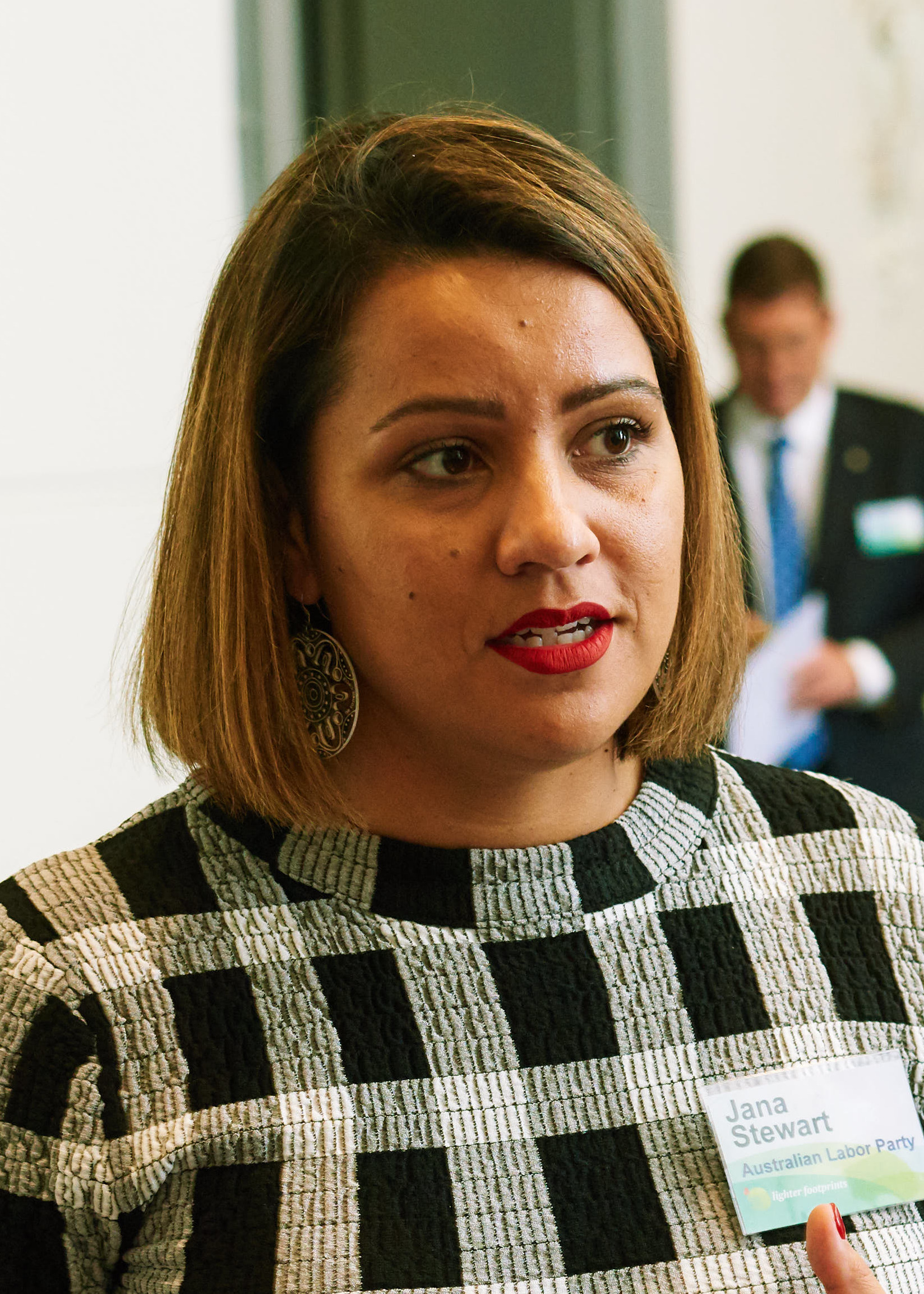
- Stewart in 2019

Senator for Victoria
- Incumbent
- Assumed office 6 April 2022
- Preceded by: Kimberley Kitching

Personal details
- Born: 27 August 1987 (age 39) Preston, Victoria, Australia
- Party: Labor
- Education: La Trobe University
- Occupation: Family therapist University lecturer Policy adviser
- Website: janastewart.com.au

Jana Naretha Anne Stewart (born 27 August 1987) is an Australian politician and former public servant. She is a member of the Australian Labor Party (ALP) and was appointed as a Senator for Victoria in April 2022, filling the vacancy caused by the death of Kimberley Kitching.

== Early life and education ==
Stewart is an Aboriginal Australian of the Muthi Muthi and Wamba-Wamba peoples. Her great-grandmother Alice Kelly was a custodian of Lake Mungo in New South Wales and was involved in negotiations over the Lake Mungo remains.

Stewart was born in 1987 and grew up in Melbourne and Swan Hill, Victoria. She is the oldest of six children and experienced family violence as a child. She attended "at least a dozen" primary schools, and was the only Indigenous student at her high school to finish year 12. She completed a master's degree in clinical family therapy at La Trobe University.

== Career ==
Prior to entering politics, Stewart worked as a family therapist, university lecturer, and policy adviser on Aboriginal affairs and child protection. She worked for Victorian state Aboriginal affairs minister Natalie Hutchins on treaty negotiations. She was a later a deputy secretary of the Victorian Department of Justice focusing on Stolen Generations reparations.

=== Career prior to Senate ===
Stewart is a member of the Labor Unity faction and is associated with the Transport Workers' Union.

At the 2019 federal election she was preselected for the House of Representatives seat of Kooyong. She placed third, with 17 percent of the vote on a negative swing of four points, behind incumbent federal treasurer Josh Frydenberg and Greens candidate Julian Burnside.

In late 2021, Stewart won ALP preselection for the seat of Pascoe Vale at the 2022 Victorian state election. She withdrew following her nomination to the Senate in March 2022.

=== Senate career ===
In March 2022, Stewart was nominated to fill a casual vacancy in the Senate caused by the death of Victorian senator Kimberley Kitching. She also won ALP preselection for the Senate ticket at the 2022 federal election.

She was officially appointed to the Senate at a joint sitting of the Victorian Parliament on 6 April 2022. However, the Senate did not sit between her appointment and the imminent election.

Stewart took her seat after the 2022 federal election. She is the youngest Aboriginal woman to serve in the federal parliament.

On 28 February 2024, Stewart was elected chair of the federal parliament Joint Standing Committee on Aboriginal and Torres Strait Islander Affairs, a position previously held by Pat Dodson.

== Personal life ==
Jana is partnered with Marcus Stewart, former co-chair of the First Peoples' Assembly of Victoria.

She and her partner have two children, Jude and Ari.
