= Bill Landeryou =

Australian politician and trade unionist (1941–2019)

Member of the Victorian Legislative Council for Doutta Galla
- In office 20 March 1976 – 10 December 1992
- Preceded by: Dolph Eddy
- Succeeded by: John Brumby

Personal details
- Born: William Albert Landeryou; 17 April 1941 Moonee Ponds, Victoria
- Died: 27 February 2019 (aged 77)
- Party: Labor Party
- Children: Andrew Landeryou
- Relatives: Kimberley Kitching (daughter-in-law)
- Occupation: Trade unionist

William Albert Landeryou (17 April 1941 – 27 February 2019) was an Australian trade unionist and politician. He was a member of the Australian Labor Party (ALP) and served in the Victorian Legislative Council from 1976 to 1992, including as a minister in the Labor government of John Cain. Before entering politics he was a senior official in the Storemen and Packers' Union.

== Early life ==
Landeryou was born in the Melbourne suburb of Moonee Ponds, the son of a timber worker. He left school at 15 and worked for a trucking company. In 1965 Landeryou was appointed as a research officer for the Storemen and Packers' Union (now the National Union of Workers), despite never having worked as a storeman or packer, after having been recommended to the state secretary by Labor Party contacts. A year later he was elected as an organiser, then as Victorian State Secretary in 1969, federal secretary in 1974 and federal president in 1979. He also became a director of 133 Sydney Rd Ltd, a company controlled by the union, which owned the R.J. Hawke Hotel, a hotel in Sydney Rd, Brunswick.

== Politics ==
Landeryou joined the Labor Party at a young age, and was President of Victorian Young Labor from 1964 to 1966. A supporter of the party's right-wing faction, and a close ally of the president of the Australian Council of Trade Unions, Bob Hawke, Landeryou became a member of the party's Victorian Administrative Committee following the removal in 1971 of the left-wing group which had controlled the Victorian Labor Party since 1955.

In 1976 Landeryou was elected to the Legislative Council as member for Doutta Galla Province, a safe Labor seat in the north-western suburbs of Melbourne. Immediately he became a member of the ALP frontbench. Clyde Holding, who had been Opposition Leader since 1967, appointed Landeryou shadow minister for ethnic affairs and consumer affairs. In 1980 Holding's successor, Frank Wilkes, appointed Landeryou shadow minister for local government. The previous year, Landeryou had become the ALP leader in the Legislative Council.

During 1981 Landeryou became convinced that Wilkes could not win the next Victorian election (due in 1982) and supported the overthrow of Wilkes by John Cain, which took place in September of that year. Cain appointed Landeryou shadow minister for employment.

When Cain led Labor to victory in the April 1982 election, forming the first Labor government in Victoria since 1955, Landeryou was appointed Minister for Economic Development and Tourism. In December 1982 he became Minister for Industrial Affairs and he was also made Minister for Labour and Industry.

Landeryou continued to serve in the Legislative Council after Cain resigned as Premier, and until the defeat of Joan Kirner's government in 1992. Future premier John Brumby succeeded him in the constituency.

== Personal life ==
After leaving Parliament, Landeryou remained active in Labor Party affairs and pursued a career in business. He died on 27 February 2019.

Landeryou's son Andrew Landeryou became prominent as a businessman and political blogger. Andrew's wife Kimberley Kitching was a Labor Party Senator for Victoria.

In December 2019, former Prime Minister Bob Hawke's daughter Rosslyn Dillon claimed that Landeryou had committed rape against her three times in 1982, while she was a staffer employed in Landeryou's office. In an affidavit lodged in the Supreme Court of New South Wales in a suit against her late father's estate, Ms Dillon claimed that Hawke urged her not to report the matter to police due to his political aspirations. Hawke's second wife Blanche d'Alpuget claimed neither she nor Bob Hawke knew of Dillon's allegations.
