= John Medley Building =

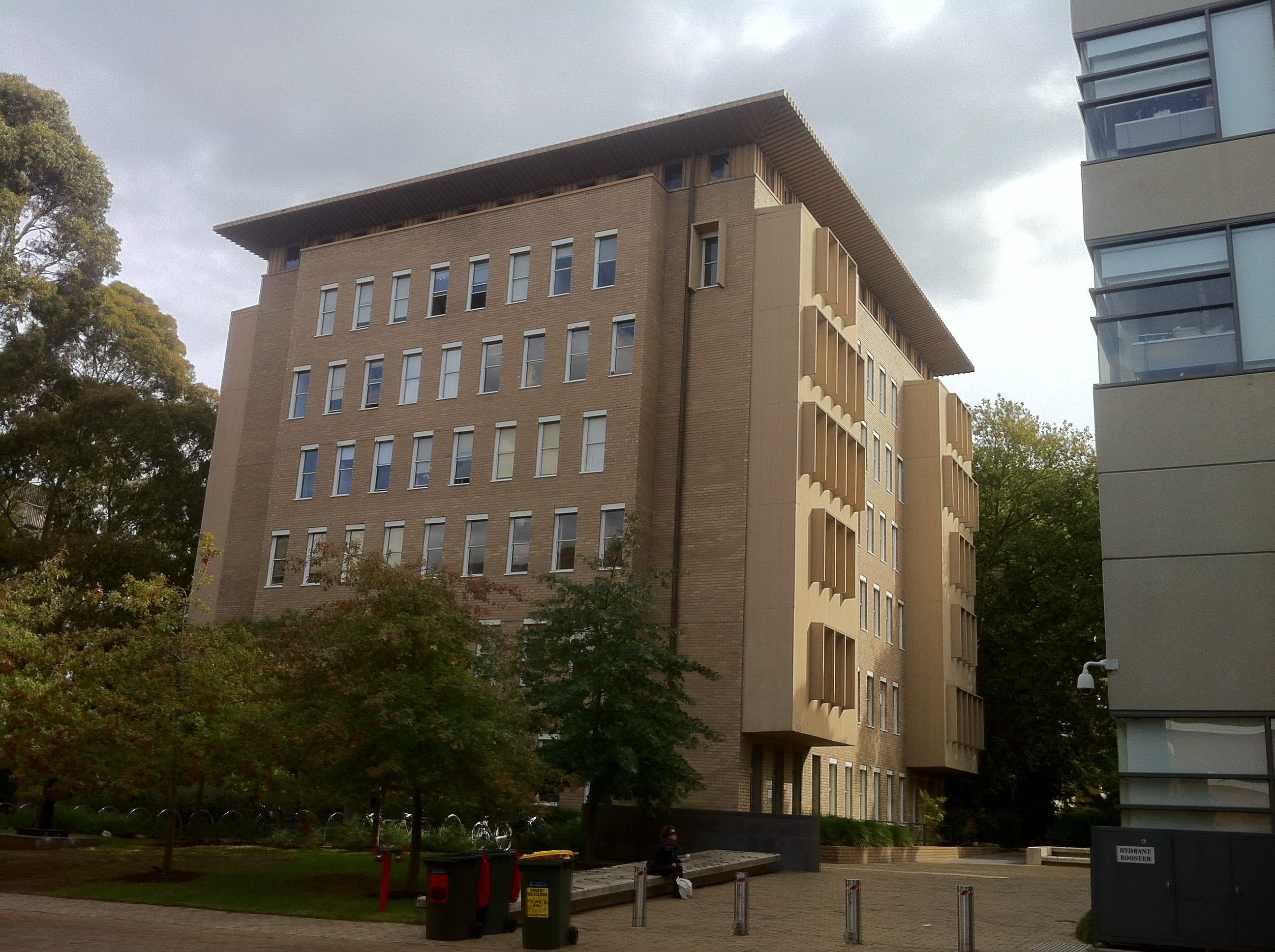
- John Medley Building east tower, May 2013
- Interactive map of the John Medley Building area
- Alternative names: Building 191
- Etymology: Sir John (Jack) Medley (Vice-Chancellor, The University of Melbourne, 1938–1951)

General information
- Status: Completed
- Type: Academic administration
- Architectural style: Brutalist
- Location: Kernot Road, The University of Melbourne, Parkville Campus, Melbourne, Victoria, Australia
- Coordinates: 37°47′57″S 144°57′38″E
- Construction started: 1969
- Completed: 1971
- Owner: The University of Melbourne

Technical details
- Material: Concrete and brick
- Floor count: 5 (with two six-storey towers)

Design and construction
- Architect: Sir Roy Burman Grounds

The John Medley Building is in Kernot Road at the University of Melbourne, Parkville Campus, Melbourne, Victoria, Australia. The building was designed by Sir Roy Grounds. It was constructed between 1969 and 1971, and was built to relieve the cramped conditions of the campus Old Arts Building, which had been built from 1919 to 1924, and to house the larger departments of the university's faculty office.

According to Sowerwine & Gamer, 2007, many in the university community began to demand more attention be paid to architectural issues of the campus, so Grounds was appointed as architect of the John Medley Building. Grounds, who developed an interest in the Bauhaus and architectural modernism, was a leader of the modernist movement but had broken away from its principles. The John Medley Building disappointed many, notwithstanding that Grounds was highly regarded in the profession, following his design of the Victorian Arts Centre.

It is currently planned that the building will be demolished by 2040, along with five other major university buildings, to create more open space on the campus.

== Design ==
The John Medley Building sits as a giant gateway to the Parkville campus of The University of Melbourne. It flanks the original axis of the campus's clock tower from Grattan Street (which has been closed to traffic since February 2018 due to ongoing construction work), which leads to the Old Quadrangle.

The building includes two medieval tower-like buildings that are joined by an arched walkway, and the pronounced corners of the building's towers suggest a fortress city. The fifth-floor Common Room, which bridges the two towers, provides excellent views of the City and the University. The two six-storey towers are named ‘East Tower’ and ‘West Tower’, and are capped by the sixth story's projected eaves. The windows of the lower levels are fitted with rounded framed, aluminum sash windows, whereas the equidistant windows of each tower's upper level appear castellated. Some windows of the towers are fitted with hooded shades.

It is not clear what materials were used to construct the John Medley Building. The building appears, from observation, to have been predominantly constructed from a light-brown brick. The pronounced corners of the towers appear to be formed using pre-cast concrete. The bridge section marks the John Medley Building in the Brutalist style, which reflected similar designs on college campuses in the United States and Canada in the previous decade. Consistent with that style, the bridge section has an inset first level of exposed aggregate concrete with thin arrow-slit windows.

=== Context in Grounds’ body of work ===
Grounds' initial design layout of the John Medley Building in 1967 drew criticism for not being functionalist enough, for having too much unusable space, and for not enough unusable space. While the building possesses modernist, especially Brutalist, tones of Grounds’ earlier National Gallery of Victoria (constructed 1959-1968), the building also reflects Grounds’ interest in the Italian neo-liberty movement. This may be seen through what Hamann, 2007 describes as, the hybridisation of palazzo forms and medieval references, which was seen by some critics as a betrayal of modernism; to combine such historical details. It was an articulation of Grounds style however, that was already evident in previous examples, such as the design Grounds prepared for Melbourne's National Art Gallery, which, according to Hamann, 2007, has an ‘oriental styled palazzo’ type of planning, and in the Cultural Centre of the late 1950s.

== Etymology ==
The building was named in 1971 in honour of Sir John (Jack) Medley, the Vice-Chancellor of The University of Melbourne, between 1938 and 1951. Medley was a member of the Eugenics Society of Victoria, an organisation credited with justifying the White Australia Policy and the removal of Aboriginal children. In the mid-2010s there was a campaign by students at both Melbourne and Monash universities to rename this building and the John Medley Library at Monash's Clayton campus. The Monash campaign was successful and the library was renamed the Student Union Recreational Library (Surly).
