= Wilam Hall =

Residential college in Carlton, Melbourne, Australia

Coordinates: 37°48′21″S 144°58′4″E

- Melbourne
- Wilam Hall Crest
- Location: 48 Drummond Street; Carlton VIC 3053
- Full name: Wilam Hall
- Motto: Benvenuta
- Motto in English: Welcome
- Established: 1954
- Named for: "Home" in Woiwurrung–Taungurung
- Principal: Dr Helen Lamb
- Undergraduates: 53
- Postgraduates: 20
- Website: Wilam Hall

Wilam Hall (previously Medley Hall) is the smallest hall of residence of the University of Melbourne in Victoria, Australia. Established in 1954, it is situated at 48 Drummond St in Carlton, Victoria, away from the other nine residential colleges in Parkville. It is home to approximately 73 students from around Australia and overseas. Wilam Hall was renamed in 2024 following the gift of the name "Wilam" by the Wurundjeri Council. The residence was previously named Medley Hall in honour of Sir John Medley, a previous Vice-Chancellor of the University of Melbourne.

Wilam Hall was closed from July 2009 to June 2011 due to a building redevelopment. Wilam Hall reopened as a residence from July 2011.

== History ==
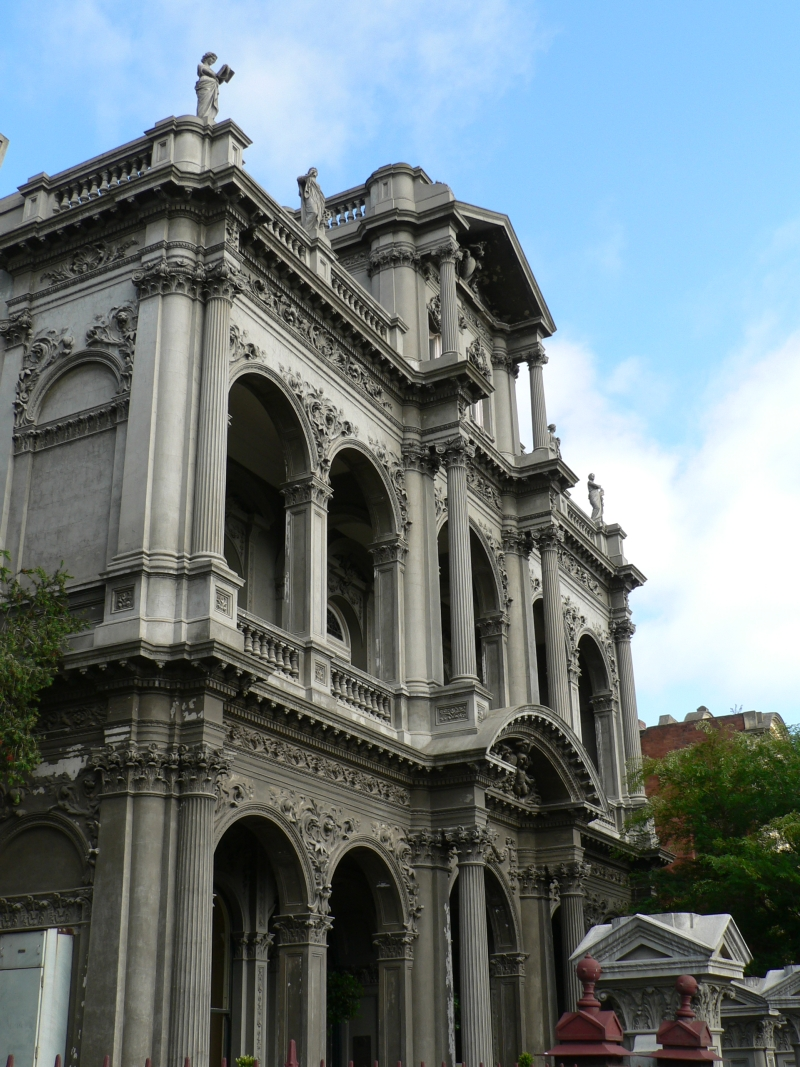
Wilam Hall, Carlton.

The main building was originally called Benvenuta. It was completed in 1893 for Leah Abrahams, the widow of a small arms dealer. In 1925 Benvenuta was leased to the Commonwealth Government, which transformed it into Arbitration Court Offices. After a period of vacancy the mansion was converted into an Italian club, boasting a ballroom, orchestra, and a regular Sunday boxing match.

Benvenuta also has its share of darker history, albeit a one full of largely unsubstantiated rumours. A bullet hole in the stained glass window at the top of the main marble staircase is supposedly evidence of criminal activity occurring from 1938, when the property was leased to a North Melbourne vigneron. Alternatively, the bullet hole is said to be the detritus of Henry Abrahams, Leah Abrahams' son, committing suicide in the hallway.

In 1949 the building was sold to the State Government, and it was refurbished by the Public Works Department for use as a student hostel. In 1951 the hostel was opened as the Drummond Street Hostel, with the Student Representative Council of the University of Melbourne overseeing its management.

In 1953 the management was taken over by the University Council, with the first Warden being appointed the following year. In 1955, the hostel was renamed Medley Hall. The hall became the first co-educational residence of the University in 1969 when it began admitting women into residence.

On 13 March 2024, the University Council resolved that the name be changed to Wilam Hall. This was the result of decades of student-led advocacy that had pointed to the participation of Sir John Medley as a member of the Eugenics Society as reason for a change away from the existing name.

Wilam Hall is also famous for its appearance in the Nicolas Cage film, Knowing, released in March 2009.

== Architecture ==
The original building was designed in an Italianate Victorian Baroque style by Walter Scott Law. Construction materials and craftsmen were imported from Italy. The construction includes stained glass and over 15 tonnes of marble and steel. It is richly decorated and features miniature statuettes on the parapets.

After its brief closure between 2009 and 2011, Wilam Hall reopened with a new extension behind the original Benvenuta building, allowing for the accommodation of an additional 16 students.

== Facilities ==
While Wilam Hall is the smallest of the hall of residence, its facilities are akin to those of other residential colleges—it has a laundry room with four washing machines and two driers, a lounge room, several dedicated study spaces, a music room with grand piano, and a communal kitchen and lounge area. Each of the three residential floors of the building has five bathrooms, a kitchenette, and a dining area.
