= Andrew Landeryou =

Australian blogger and businessman

- Born: c. 1969-70; Australia
- Occupations: Blogger, businessman
- Relatives: Bill Landeryou (father); Kimberley Kitching (wife)
- Writing career
- Genre: Politics

Andrew John Clyde Landeryou (born c. 1969–70) is an Australian former political blogger. He is the widower of Victorian Senator Kimberley Kitching.

== Early life and business career ==
Landeryou is the son of Bill Landeryou, a former Leader of the Opposition and then the Government in the Victorian Legislative Council and a minister in the Australian Labor Party Victorian state government of John Cain. Andrew Landeryou was active in the Labor Party, and particularly the Labor Right faction. He was elected as President of Melbourne University Student Union, taking office in January 1991. A referendum of union members removed him after five months when he proposed commercialising the union's services. He then became managing director of IQ Corporation, a sports statistics company, which was invested in by Solomon Lew until it went into liquidation in 2003. He was also a co-owner of Marbain, a company with a contract with MUSU. After he failed to answer a court summons in December 2004, Landeryou spent five months in Costa Rica. In May 2005, he was arrested on his return to Australia and required to attend at a liquidator's examination of the affairs of MUSU. Landeryou was declared bankrupt by the Federal Magistrates Court in May 2006.

== Blogging ==
In 2005, Landeryou established a weblog commenting on Australian party politics called The Other Cheek – Andrew Landeryou's Blog of Freedom. Lucy Saunders, a political activist linked to the Socialist Left who had been criticised by Landeryou, wrote on ABC News Online that "The overwhelming majority of what Landeryou prints is vague rumour, personal vendettas and outright fiction. Very occasionally, though, some actual facts sneak through."

He clashed with another political blogger, Stephen Mayne, in 2006 when they accused each other of being spivs.

After The Other Cheek was deleted in 2008, Landeryou launched the tabloid website VEXNEWS, which closed in 2013. Andrew Bolt from the Herald Sun referred to Landeryou as "always entertaining" and "often compelling," while The Age newspaper described the site as "dirt-dishing".

VEXNEWS broke a story revealing AFL footballer Brendan Fevola's attack on a Melbourne journalist. Landeryou also broke a story drawing on Liberal party sources when he revealed that the authors of an anti-Ted Baillieu website were employees of Baillieu's own party.

Other front-page stories prompted by Landeryou include a Fairfax story about Australian politicians sanitising their Wikipedia articles and a story about a Christian Family First candidate who had exposed himself in photographs. Landeryou declared him 'Australia's smallest loser', an epithet repeated by MSNBC's Keith Olbermann when he covered the story for US cable news.

== Legal issues ==
=== Election signs diversion ===
Landeryou was arrested along with two other men in St Kilda at 2.40am on the morning of the 2016 federal election, with police stating that they seized box cutters from the car the men were travelling in. They were charged over an alleged vandalism spree in the Melbourne electorate of Labor MP Michael Danby.

At the time, Bill Shorten said “anyone in an election who is conducting vandalism deserves to have the book thrown at them”. Victorian Nationals senator Bridget McKenzie told the Federal Parliament that the four men had been arrested “for allegedly vandalising Greens and Liberal polling material at multiple polling stations from Elwood to Port Melbourne” and “allegedly driving at volunteers who tried to stop them”. Landeryou was reportedly charged with five counts of damaging and five counts of stealing rival Liberal and Greens campaign advertising material. On 28 April 2017 he received a diversion and did not plea. Magistrate Ann Collins ordered Landeryou and his co-accused David Boutros-Asmar, George Droutsas and Dean Sheriff to pay $1,000 to the court and told them "You acted more like schoolboys than like adults". They were ordered to write letters of apology to the Polcie informant now Greens Senator Steph Hodgins-May whose signs they had taken down, which allows people to avoid convictions for minor crimes if they take responsibility for them.
