= Walter Scott Law =

- Born: 1852; London, England
- Died: 1928 (aged 75–76); England
- Occupation: Architect
- Spouse: Czarina Annie Egan
- Children: 4

Walter Scott Law was an English-born architect based in Melbourne, Australia and later in Cape Town, South Africa. He designed many buildings in Carlton, a suburb of Melbourne.

== Early life ==
Walter Scott Law was born in 1852 in London, England.

== Career ==
Law emigrated to Australia, where he became a renowned architect in Melbourne. For example, in 1887–1889, he designed the Biltmore building located at 152 Bridport Street in Albert Park. In 1890–1891, he designed Drummond Terrace, located at 93-105 Drummond Street in Carlton. In 1892, he designed the Benvenuta building located at 48 Drummond Street, also in Carlton. The building was originally built as a private mansion for Leah Abrahams, a wealthy widow; it now forms part of Wilam Hall, a residential college by the University of Melbourne. Additionally, he designed the Rosaville building located next door, at 46 Drummond Street in Carlton, which is now also part of Wilam Hall. He went on to design many more buildings in Carlton, mostly for Jewish clients.

From Australia, Law moved to Cape Town. The city's Heritage Building Plans Register shows that, from 1896 onwards, he designed many houses (both free-standing and in terraces), factories, shops and offices, and a convent. Some of the houses were in Law Road in the suburb of Three Anchor Bay which, together with neighbouring Walter Road, may have been named after him.

== Personal life and death ==
Law married Czarina Annie Egan. They had four children.

Law died in 1928.

== Gallery ==
Melbourne buildings designed by Walter Scott Law
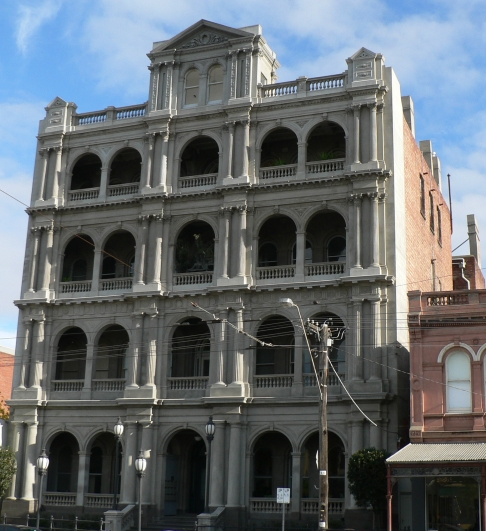
Biltmore

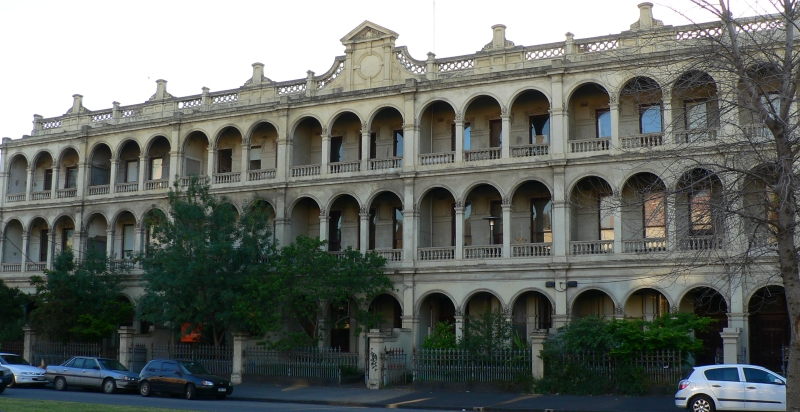
Drummond Terrace

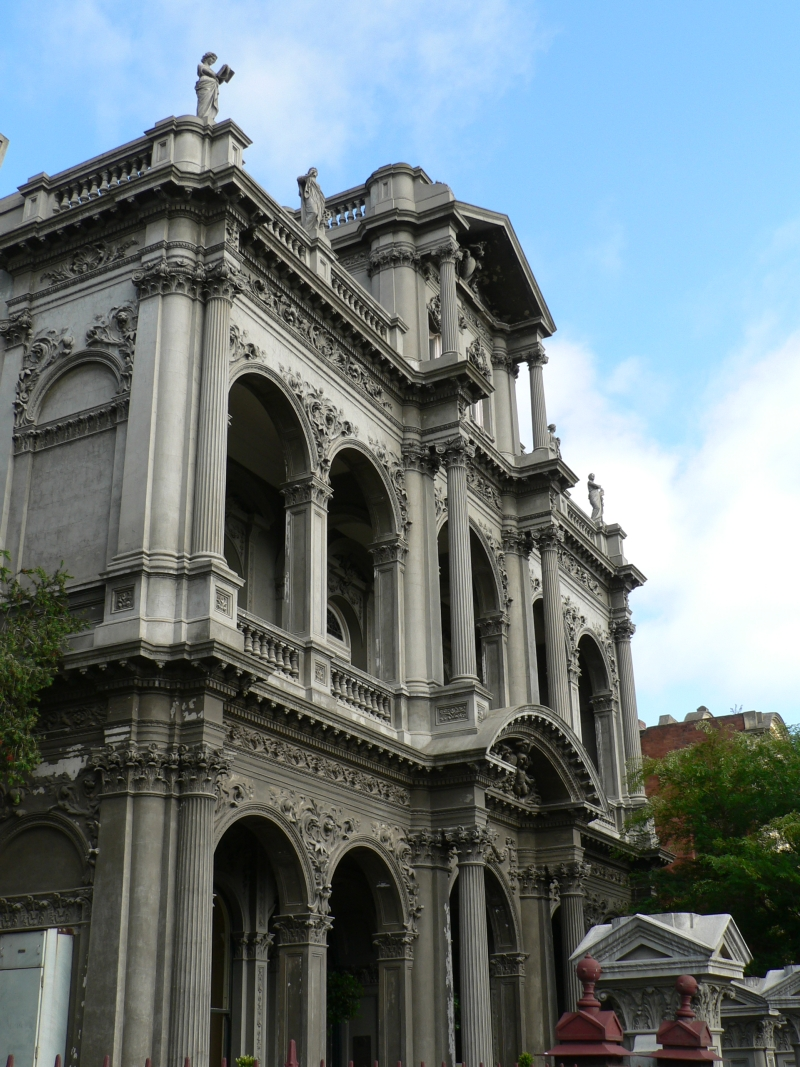
Benvenuta (Wilam Hall)

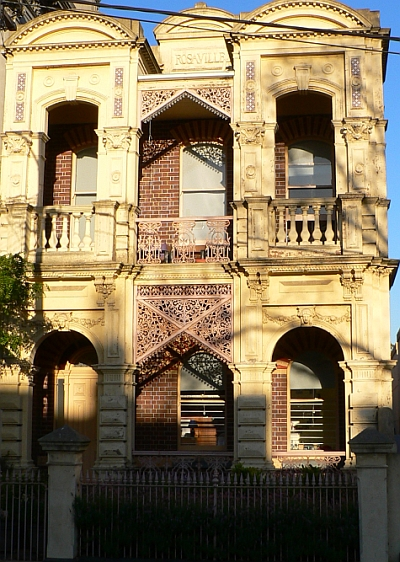
Rosaville
