= Electoral results for the Ballarat Province =

Victoria, Australia, district election results

This is a list of electoral results for the Ballarat Province in Victorian state elections.

== Members for Ballarat Province ==
| Year | Member | Party | Member | Party |
|---|---|---|---|---|
| 1937 | Alfred Pittard | United Australia | | |
| 1940 | Alfred Pittard | United Australia | George Bolster | United Australia |
| 1943 | Alfred Pittard | United Australia | George Bolster | United Australia |
| 1945 | Alfred Pittard | Liberal | George Bolster | Liberal |
| 1946 | Alfred Pittard | Liberal | James Kittson | Liberal |
| 1949 | Alfred Pittard | Liberal and Country | James Kittson | Liberal and Country |
| 1949 | Herbert Ludbrook | Liberal and Country | James Kittson | Liberal and Country |
| 1952 | Herbert Ludbrook | Liberal and Country | Jack Jones | Labor |
| 1955 | Herbert Ludbrook | Liberal and Country | Jack Jones | Labor |
| 1956 | Pat Dickie | Liberal and Country | Jack Jones | Labor |
| 1958 | Pat Dickie | Liberal and Country | Murray Byrne | Liberal and Country |
| 1961 | Pat Dickie | Liberal and Country | Murray Byrne | Liberal and Country |
| 1964 | Pat Dickie | Liberal and Country | Murray Byrne | Liberal and Country |
| 1965 | Pat Dickie | Liberal | Murray Byrne | Liberal |
| 1967 | Pat Dickie | Liberal | Murray Byrne | Liberal |
| 1970 | Pat Dickie | Liberal | Murray Byrne | Liberal |
| 1973 | Pat Dickie | Liberal | Murray Byrne | Liberal |
| 1976 | Pat Dickie | Liberal | Rob Knowles | Liberal |
| 1978 | David Williams | Labor | Rob Knowles | Liberal |
| 1979 | Clive Bubb | Liberal | Rob Knowles | Liberal |
| 1982 | Clive Bubb | Liberal | Rob Knowles | Liberal |
| 1985 | Dick de Fegely | Liberal | Rob Knowles | Liberal |
| 1988 | Dick de Fegely | Liberal | Rob Knowles | Liberal |
| 1992 | Dick de Fegely | Liberal | Rob Knowles | Liberal |
| 1996 | Dick de Fegely | Liberal | Rob Knowles | Liberal |
| 1999 | Dianne Hadden | Labor | John McQuilten | Labor |
| 2002 | Dianne Hadden | Labor | John McQuilten | Labor |

== Election results ==
=== Elections in the 2000s ===
2002 Victorian state election: Ballarat Province
| Party | Candidate | Votes | % | ±% |
|---|---|---|---|---|
| Labor | John McQuilten | 72,519 | 52.5 | +3.0 |
| Liberal | Helen Bath | 48,645 | 35.2 | −10.5 |
| Greens | Cherie Bridges | 14,182 | 10.3 | +10.3 |
| Democrats | Geoff Lutz | 2,809 | 2.0 | −2.3 |
| Total formal votes | | 138,155 | 97.0 | 0.0 |
| Informal votes | | 4,317 | 3.0 | 0.0 |
| Turnout | | 142,472 | 94.5 | |
Two-party-preferred result
| Labor | John McQuilten | 84,713 | 61.3 | +9.0 |
| Liberal | Helen Bath | 53,426 | 38.7 | −9.0 |
| Labor hold | | Swing | +9.0 | |

=== Elections in the 1990s ===
1999 Victorian state election: Ballarat by-election
| Party | Candidate | Votes | % | ±% |
|---|---|---|---|---|
| Labor | John McQuilten | 58,904 | 48.4 | +6.8 |
| Liberal | Helen Bath | 55,191 | 45.3 | −6.3 |
| Greens | Charmaine Clarke | 5,233 | 4.3 | +4.3 |
| Independent | Jim Patterson | 2,423 | 2.0 | +2.0 |
| Total formal votes | | 121,751 | 97.1 | −1.1 |
| Informal votes | | 3,631 | 2.9 | +1.1 |
| Turnout | | 125,382 | 93.9 | |
Two-party-preferred result
| Labor | John McQuilten | 63,589 | 52.2 | +6.6 |
| Liberal | Helen Bath | 58,162 | 47.8 | −6.6 |
| Labor gain from Liberal | | Swing | +6.6 | |

This election was caused by the vacancy following the resignation of Rob Knowles, who unsuccessfully contested the lower house seat of Gisborne.

1999 Victorian state election: Ballarat Province
| Party | Candidate | Votes | % | ±% |
|---|---|---|---|---|
| Labor | Dianne Hadden-Tregear | 57,655 | 47.9 | +6.4 |
| Liberal | David Clark | 55,834 | 46.4 | −5.3 |
| Democrats | Geoff Lutz | 6,853 | 5.7 | +1.8 |
| Total formal votes | | 120,342 | 97.3 | −0.9 |
| Informal votes | | 3,383 | 2.7 | +0.9 |
| Turnout | | 123,725 | 92.6 | |
Two-party-preferred result
| Labor | Dianne Hadden-Tregear | 61,774 | 51.3 | +5.7 |
| Liberal | David Clark | 58,568 | 48.7 | −5.7 |
| Labor gain from Liberal | | Swing | +5.7 | |

1996 Victorian state election: Ballarat Province
| Party | Candidate | Votes | % | ±% |
|---|---|---|---|---|
| Liberal | Rob Knowles | 62,107 | 51.7 | −2.2 |
| Labor | Catherine Laffey | 49,943 | 41.5 | +0.7 |
| Democrats | Myrna Rance | 4,687 | 3.9 | +3.9 |
| Call to Australia | David Cocking | 2,163 | 1.8 | +1.8 |
| Democratic Labor | Brian Lugar | 1,343 | 1.1 | −4.2 |
| Total formal votes | | 120,243 | 98.2 | +1.1 |
| Informal votes | | 2,258 | 1.8 | −1.1 |
| Turnout | | 122,501 | 94.9 | |
Two-party-preferred result
| Liberal | Rob Knowles | 65,312 | 54.4 | −0.9 |
| Labor | Catherine Laffey | 54,796 | 45.6 | +0.9 |
| Liberal hold | | Swing | −0.9 | |

1992 Victorian state election: Ballarat Province
| Party | Candidate | Votes | % | ±% |
|---|---|---|---|---|
| Liberal | Dick de Fegely | 62,482 | 53.9 | +5.2 |
| Labor | Geoff Howard | 47,384 | 40.9 | −3.3 |
| Democratic Labor | Brian Lugar | 6,110 | 5.3 | +5.3 |
| Total formal votes | | 115,976 | 97.1 | −0.5 |
| Informal votes | | 3,488 | 2.9 | +0.5 |
| Turnout | | 119,464 | 96.2 | |
Two-party-preferred result
| Liberal | Dick de Fegely | 64,166 | 55.3 | +0.9 |
| Labor | Geoff Howard | 51,763 | 44.7 | −0.9 |
| Liberal hold | | Swing | +0.9 | |

=== Elections in the 1980s ===
1988 Victorian state election: Ballarat Province
| Party | Candidate | Votes | % | ±% |
|---|---|---|---|---|
| Liberal | Rob Knowles | 59,963 | 49.2 | +0.2 |
| Labor | Glendon Ludbrook | 53,807 | 44.1 | +0.1 |
| National | Anne Scott | 8,170 | 6.7 | +6.7 |
| Total formal votes | | 121,940 | 97.5 | −0.5 |
| Informal votes | | 3,143 | 2.5 | +0.5 |
| Turnout | | 125,083 | 94.2 | −0.7 |
Two-party-preferred result
| Liberal | Rob Knowles | 66,508 | 54.5 | +3.6 |
| Labor | Glendon Ludbrook | 55,429 | 45.5 | −3.6 |
| Liberal hold | | Swing | +3.6 | |

1985 Victorian state election: Ballarat Province
| Party | Candidate | Votes | % | ±% |
|---|---|---|---|---|
| Liberal | Dick de Fegely | 55,702 | 49.0 | |
| Labor | Roger Lowrey | 49,966 | 44.0 | |
| Democrats | William Ross | 8,009 | 7.0 | |
| Total formal votes | | 113,677 | 98.0 | |
| Informal votes | | 2,347 | 2.0 | |
| Turnout | | 116,024 | 94.8 | |
Two-party-preferred result
| Liberal | Dick de Fegely | 57,851 | 50.9 | −1.0 |
| Labor | Roger Lowrey | 55,806 | 49.1 | +1.0 |
| Liberal hold | | Swing | −1.0 | |

1982 Victorian state election: Ballarat Province
| Party | Candidate | Votes | % | ±% |
|---|---|---|---|---|
| Liberal | Rob Knowles | 42,653 | 48.3 | −3.7 |
| Labor | Stephen Blomeley | 39,352 | 44.6 | −3.4 |
| Democrats | June Johnson | 6,319 | 7.2 | +7.2 |
| Total formal votes | | 88,234 | 98.0 | +0.5 |
| Informal votes | | 1,834 | 2.0 | −0.5 |
| Turnout | | 90,158 | 95.0 | +0.1 |
Two-party-preferred result
| Liberal | Rob Knowles | 45,637 | 51.7 | −0.3 |
| Labor | Stephen Blomeley | 42,687 | 48.3 | +0.3 |
| Liberal hold | | Swing | −0.3 | |

=== Elections in the 1970s ===
1979 Victorian state election: Ballarat Province
| Party | Candidate | Votes | % | ±% |
|---|---|---|---|---|
| Liberal | Clive Bubb | 43,501 | 52.0 | −6.9 |
| Labor | David Williams | 40,198 | 48.0 | +6.9 |
| Total formal votes | | 83,699 | 97.5 | +0.1 |
| Informal votes | | 2,154 | 2.5 | −0.1 |
| Turnout | | 85,853 | 94.9 | −0.1 |
| Liberal hold | | Swing | −6.9 | |

- This seat was won by Labor in the 1978 by-election, but is recorded as a Liberal party hold.

1978 Ballarat Province state by-election
| Party | Candidate | Votes | % | ±% |
|---|---|---|---|---|
| Labor | David Williams | 31,354 | 46.1 | +5.0 |
| Liberal | Robert Vinecombe | 28,152 | 41.4 | −17.5 |
| Democrats | June Johnson | 5,498 | 8.1 | +8.1 |
| Democratic Labor | Stan Keon | 2,339 | 3.4 | +3.4 |
| Independent | Edward Campion | 667 | 1.0 | +1.0 |
| Total formal votes | | 68,010 | 98.3 | +0.9 |
| Informal votes | | 1,202 | 1.7 | −0.9 |
| Turnout | | 69,212 | 92.6 | −2.4 |
Two-party-preferred result
| Labor | David Williams | 34,251 | 50.4 | +9.3 |
| Liberal | Robert Vinecombe | 33,759 | 49.6 | −9.3 |
| Labor gain from Liberal | | Swing | +9.3 | |

This by-election was caused by the resignation of Vance Dickie.

1976 Victorian state election: Ballarat Province
| Party | Candidate | Votes | % | ±% |
|---|---|---|---|---|
| Liberal | Rob Knowles | 45,545 | 58.9 | |
| Labor | Ronald Corbett | 31,783 | 41.1 | |
| Total formal votes | | 77,328 | 97.4 | |
| Informal votes | | 2,056 | 2.6 | |
| Turnout | | 79,384 | 95.0 | |
| Liberal hold | | Swing | | |

1973 Victorian state election: Ballarat Province
| Party | Candidate | Votes | % | ±% |
|---|---|---|---|---|
| Liberal | Vance Dickie | 27,500 | 44.8 | −3.0 |
| Labor | Ronald Corbett | 24,259 | 39.5 | −0.1 |
| Democratic Labor | William Griffin | 5,317 | 8.6 | −4.0 |
| Country | Patrick Hope | 4,318 | 7.0 | +7.0 |
| Total formal votes | | 61,394 | 97.1 | −0.6 |
| Informal votes | | 1,862 | 2.9 | +0.6 |
| Turnout | | 63,256 | 95.0 | −0.9 |
Two-party-preferred result
| Liberal | Vance Dickie | 35,871 | 58.4 | −1.1 |
| Labor | Ronald Corbett | 25,523 | 41.6 | +1.1 |
| Liberal hold | | Swing | −1.1 | |

1970 Victorian state election: Ballarat Province
| Party | Candidate | Votes | % | ±% |
|---|---|---|---|---|
| Liberal | Murray Byrne | 27,013 | 47.8 | +6.4 |
| Labor | Jack Jones | 22,349 | 39.6 | +6.5 |
| Democratic Labor | William Bruty | 7,106 | 12.6 | −2.1 |
| Total formal votes | | 56,468 | 97.7 | −0.5 |
| Informal votes | | 1,313 | 2.3 | +0.5 |
| Turnout | | 57,781 | 95.9 | −0.4 |
Two-party-preferred result
| Liberal | Murray Byrne | 33,568 | 59.5 | −2.3 |
| Labor | Jack Jones | 22,900 | 40.5 | +2.3 |
| Liberal hold | | Swing | −2.3 | |

=== Elections in the 1960s ===
1967 Victorian state election: Ballarat Province
| Party | Candidate | Votes | % | ±% |
|---|---|---|---|---|
| Liberal | Pat Dickie | 22,970 | 41.4 | |
| Labor | Kevin Healy | 18,755 | 33.1 | |
| Democratic Labor | James Burns | 8,118 | 14.7 | |
| Country | Robert Cooper | 5,626 | 10.1 | |
| Total formal votes | | 55,469 | 98.2 | |
| Informal votes | | 1,515 | 1.8 | |
| Turnout | | 56,984 | 96.3 | |
Two-party-preferred result
| Liberal | Pat Dickie | 34,227 | 61.8 | |
| Labor | Kevin Healy | 21,192 | 38.2 | |
| Liberal hold | | Swing | | |

1964 Victorian state election: Ballarat Province
| Party | Candidate | Votes | % | ±% |
|---|---|---|---|---|
| Liberal and Country | Murray Byrne | 27,833 | 50.7 | +10.4 |
| Labor | Gordon Campbell | 18,935 | 34.5 | −7.8 |
| Democratic Labor | William Bruty | 8,134 | 14.8 | −2.7 |
| Total formal votes | | 54,902 | 98.2 | +0.2 |
| Informal votes | | 1,017 | 1.8 | −0.2 |
| Turnout | | 55,919 | 96.2 | +0.4 |
Two-party-preferred result
| Liberal and Country | Murray Byrne | | 64.0 | +7.9 |
| Labor | Gordon Campbell | | 36.0 | −7.9 |
| Liberal and Country hold | | Swing | +7.9 | |

- Two party preferred vote was estimated.

1961 Victorian state election: Ballarat Province
| Party | Candidate | Votes | % | ±% |
|---|---|---|---|---|
| Labor | Jack Jones | 22,663 | 42.3 | −1.3 |
| Liberal and Country | Pat Dickie | 21,603 | 40.3 | +0.6 |
| Democratic Labor | William Bruty | 9,368 | 17.5 | +6.8 |
| Total formal votes | | 53,634 | 98.0 | −0.7 |
| Informal votes | | 1,092 | 2.0 | +0.7 |
| Turnout | | 54,726 | 95.8 | −0.1 |
Two-party-preferred result
| Liberal and Country | Pat Dickie | 30,105 | 56.1 | +5.2 |
| Labor | Jack Jones | 23,529 | 43.9 | −5.2 |
| Liberal and Country hold | | Swing | +5.2 | |

=== Elections in the 1950s ===
1958 Victorian Legislative Council election: Ballarat Province
| Party | Candidate | Votes | % | ±% |
|---|---|---|---|---|
| Labor | Jack Jones | 23,336 | 43.6 | +0.5 |
| Liberal and Country | Murray Byrne | 21,227 | 39.7 | −17.2 |
| Democratic Labor | Maurice Calnin | 5,692 | 10.7 | +10.7 |
| Independent | David Milburn | 3,214 | 6.0 | +6.0 |
| Total formal votes | | 53,649 | 98.7 | −0.3 |
| Informal votes | | 682 | 1.3 | +0.3 |
| Turnout | | 54,151 | 95.9 | +1.2 |
Two-party-preferred result
| Liberal and Country | Murray Byrne | 27,210 | 50.9 | −6.0 |
| Labor | Jack Jones | 26,259 | 49.1 | +6.0 |
| Liberal and Country gain from Labor | | Swing | −6.0 | |
