= Candidates of the 1999 Victorian state election =

The 1999 Victorian state election was held on 18 September 1999.

== Retiring Members ==
=== Labor ===
- Neil Cole MLA (Melbourne)
- David Cunningham MLA (Melton)
- Demetri Dollis MLA (Richmond)
- Eddie Micallef MLA (Springvale)
- Jan Wilson MLA (Dandenong North)
- Tayfun Eren MLC (Doutta Galla)
- Caroline Hogg MLC (Melbourne North)
- Jean McLean MLC (Melbourne West)
- Pat Power MLC (Jika Jika)
- Barry Pullen MLC (Melbourne)

=== Liberal ===
- Geoff Coleman MLA (Bennettswood)
- Phil Gude MLA (Hawthorn)
- Paul Jenkins MLA (Ballarat West)
- David Perrin MLA (Bulleen)
- Jim Plowman MLA (Evelyn)
- Tom Reynolds MLA (Gisborne)
- Ian Smith MLA (Polwarth)
- Alan Stockdale MLA (Brighton)
- Marie Tehan MLA (Seymour)
- Jan Wade MLA (Kew)
- Dick de Fegely MLC (Ballarat)
- Ron Wells MLC (Eumemmerring)
- Rosemary Varty MLC (Silvan)

=== National ===
- Bill McGrath MLA (Wimmera)
- John McGrath MLA (Warrnambool)

== Legislative Assembly ==
Sitting members are shown in bold text. Successful candidates are highlighted in the relevant colour. Where there is possible confusion, an asterisk (*) is also used.

Electorate	Held by	Labor candidates	Coalition candidates	Other candidates
Albert Park	Labor	**John Thwaites**	Rob Rushford (Lib)	
Altona	Labor	**Lynne Kosky**	Steve Lambrinakos (Lib)	
Ballarat East	Liberal	Geoff Howard	**Barry Traynor** (Lib)	
Ballarat West	Liberal	Karen Overington	Judy Verlin (Lib)	
Bayswater	Liberal	Susan Craven	**Gordon Ashley** (Lib)	James Bristow (HPA)
Bellarine	Liberal	Kerri Erler	**Garry Spry** (Lib)	Erica Menheere-Thompson (Dem)
Benalla	National	Denise Allen	**Pat McNamara** (Nat)	
Benambra	Liberal	Barbara Murdoch	**Tony Plowman** (Lib)	
Bendigo East	Liberal	Jacinta Allan	**Michael John** (Lib)	Bruce Rivendell (Grn); Alf Thorpe (ARP)
Bendigo West	Labor	**Bob Cameron**	Felix Cappy (Lib)	Anne Hall (Grn); Alan Howard (Ind)
Bennettswood	Liberal	Meryl Andrews	Ron Wilson (Lib)	
Bentleigh	Liberal	Cartha Maloney	**Inga Peulich** (Lib)	Marcus Barber (Ind); Nick Brunton (Grn); Gail King (DLP)
Berwick	Liberal	Philip Reed	**Robert Dean** (Lib)	Michael Rowe (DLP)
Box Hill	Liberal	Claire Thorn	**Robert Clark** (Lib)	June Waters (HPA)
Brighton	Liberal	Irene Dunsmuir	Louise Asher (Lib)	Alex Del Porto (Ind)
Broadmeadows	Labor	**John Brumby**	Paul Tay (Lib)	Abboud Haidar (Ind); Joseph Kaliniy (Ind); Graeme Marr (Ind)
Bulleen	Liberal	Christos Miras	Nicholas Kotsiras (Lib)	Damian Manassa (HPA); Robert Trafficante (Grn)
Bundoora	Labor	**Sherryl Garbutt**	Carol McCabe (Lib)	Ngaire Mason (NLP)
Burwood	Liberal	Bob Stensholt	**Jeff Kennett** (Lib)	Justice Abolish (ACS); Mark Bunn (NLP)
Carrum	Liberal	Jenny Lindell	**David Lean** (Lib)	Dan Bray (Grn)
Caulfield	Liberal	Harry Simon	**Helen Shardey** (Lib)	
Clayton	Labor	**Hong Lim**	Collin Lok (Lib)	
Coburg	Labor	**Carlo Carli**	Mark Hrycek (Lib)	Emma Rush (Grn)
Cranbourne	Liberal	Jude Perera	**Gary Rowe** (Lib)	Carol McCormack (Ind)
Dandenong	Labor	**John Pandazopoulos**	Astrid Miller (Lib)	
Dandenong North	Labor	John Lenders	George Emmanouil (Lib)	Greg Harris (Ind); Fred Klimek (ARP)
Doncaster	Liberal	Jessie McCallum	**Victor Perton** (Lib)	Geoff Dawe (HPA); Sam Fyfield (Grn)
Dromana	Liberal	Diane Thompson	**Martin Dixon** (Lib)	Jan Charlwood (NLP); Pat Crea (DLP)
Eltham	Liberal	Pam Hanney	**Wayne Phillips** (Lib)	Sean Carter (Dem); June English (Ind); Margaret Jennings (Ind); Wendy Rosenfeldt (NLP); Jeremy Whitehead (Grn)
Essendon	Labor	**Judy Maddigan**	Ken Saunders (Lib)	
Evelyn	Liberal	Natasha Marquez-Bridger	Christine Fyffe (Lib)	Colin Gillam (Ind); Rick Houlihan (Ind)
Footscray	Labor	**Bruce Mildenhall**	Dina Lynch (Lib)	
Forest Hill	Liberal	Julie Buxton	**John Richardson** (Lib)	Sandra Hardiman (HPA)
Frankston	Liberal	Darren Koch	**Andrea McCall** (Lib)	Frank Borg (Ind); Henry Kelsall (Grn)
Frankston East	Labor	Matt Viney	Cherie McLean (Lib)	Robert Anderson (Ind); Ian Bunyan (Ind); Garry Burleigh (Ind); Geoff Clark (Ind); Lawrence Clarke (NLP); Pat Crea (DLP); Jason Coppard (Ind); David Dawn (Ind); Graham Eames (Ind); Raymond Hoser (Ind); Malcolm McClure (Ind); Ivan Pavlekovich-Smith (Ind); Scott Rankin (Ind); Mervyn Vogt (Grn)
Geelong	Liberal	Ian Trezise	**Ann Henderson** (Lib)	Rosemary Faris (Ind); Luke Grose (Ind); John O'Dea (Ind)
Geelong North	Labor	**Peter Loney**	Bryan Kennett (Lib)	
Gippsland East	National	Bill Bolitho	**David Treasure** (Nat)	Ben Buckley (Ind); Michael Freshwater (ON); Craig Ingram* (Ind)
Gippsland South	National	Howard Emanuel	**Peter Ryan** (Nat)	Rohin Clarke (NLP); Mal Sayers (Ind)
Gippsland West	Independent	Pauline Taylor	Wesley Head (Nat); Gerard McRae (Lib)	**Susan Davies*** (Ind); Mike Lowry (Ind); Martin Richardson (NLP)
Gisborne	Liberal	Joanne Duncan	Rob Knowles (Lib)	Deb Dunn (Ind); Lawrie Hall (Grn); Russell Mowatt (Dem); George Reynolds (Ind)
Glen Waverley	Liberal	Robert Dalby	**Ross Smith** (Lib)	
Hawthorn	Liberal	N. R. Wickiramasingham	Ted Baillieu (Lib)	Kerry Dawborn (HPA)
Ivanhoe	Labor	**Craig Langdon**	Don McLean (Lib)	Lawrence Clarke (NLP); Lee-Anne Poynton (HPA); Robyn Roberts (Grn)
Keilor	Labor	**George Seitz**	Joe Fenech (Lib)	Heather Burns (Ind)
Kew	Liberal	Jonathon Lewes	Andrew McIntosh (Lib)	Peter Hale (HPA)
Knox	Liberal	Christopher Smith	**Hurtle Lupton** (Lib)	Ken Wells (DLP)
Malvern	Liberal	Jude Wallace	**Robert Doyle** (Lib)	
Melbourne	Labor	Bronwyn Pike	Lana McLean (Lib)	Jorge Jorquera (Ind)
Melton	Labor	Don Nardella	John McGeary (Lib)	
Mildura	Independent	John Zigouras	Peter Danson (Lib); Anne Mansell (Nat)	Tom Joyce (Dem); **Russell Savage*** (Ind)
Mill Park	Labor	**Alex Andrianopoulos**	Andrew Davenport (Lib)	Rosie D'Angelo (NLP)
Mitcham	Labor	**Tony Robinson**	Andrew Munroe (Lib)	Chris Aubrey (Ind); Tim Petherbridge (HPA)
Monbulk	Liberal	Leslie Wood	**Steve McArthur** (Lib)	Frank Feltham (DLP); Robyn Holtham (Grn); Lorna Scurfield (NLP); Wolf Voigt (CDP)
Mooroolbark	Liberal	Darren McCrorey	**Lorraine Elliott** (Lib)	
Mordialloc	Liberal	Robyn McLeod	**Geoff Leigh** (Lib)	
Mornington	Liberal	Gwen Cornelius	**Robin Cooper** (Lib)	Vivienne Nicholson (Ind); Snez Plunkett (Ind)
Morwell	Labor	**Keith Hamilton**	Peter Tyler (Lib)	Helen Hoppner (Ind)
Murray Valley	National	Zuvele Leschen	**Ken Jasper** (Nat)	
Narracan	Liberal	Ian Maxfield	**Florian Andrighetto** (Lib)	Colin Dowling (ASP); Michael Fozard (Dem); Ray Mathieson (Ind); Heather Robinson (Ind)
Niddrie	Labor	**Rob Hulls**	Susannah Kruger (Lib)	
Northcote	Labor	**Mary Delahunty**	Elizabeth Richardson (Lib)	Susanna Duffy (Ind)
Oakleigh	Liberal	Ann Barker	**Denise McGill** (Lib)	Loredana Eboli (Ind); Stephanie McGregor (Ind); Raymond Schlager (NLP); Susan Walters (Grn)
Pakenham	Liberal	John Anderson	**Rob Maclellan** (Lib)	Frank Dean (Ind); Daniel Scoullar (Grn)
Pascoe Vale	Labor	**Christine Campbell**	Valentine Aghajani (Lib)	
Polwarth	Liberal	Steve Gartland	Paul Couch (Nat); Terry Mulder* (Lib)	Sally-Anne Brown (Grn); Brian Crook (Ind)
Portland	Liberal	Lesley Ann Jackson	**Denis Napthine** (Lib)	Patrick Kempton (Ind)
Prahran	Liberal	Joseph O'Reilly	**Leonie Burke** (Lib)	Margaret Dawson (NLP); Frances Murphy (DLP); Wendy Salter (Grn)
Preston	Labor	**Michael Leighton**	Ruth Padgett (Lib)	Michael Dickins (NLP)
Richmond	Labor	Richard Wynne	Duc-Dung Tran (Lib)	Stephen Jolly (Ind)
Ripon	Liberal	Joe Helper	**Steve Elder** (Lib)	
Rodney	National	Mal McCullough	**Noel Maughan** (Nat)	Dorothy Hutton (ON)
Sandringham	Liberal	Janice Munt	**Murray Thompson** (Lib)	
Seymour	Liberal	Ben Hardman	Di Rule (Lib)	Jim Romagnesi (Grn)
Shepparton	National	Wendy Boyle	**Don Kilgour** (Nat)	Chris Hazelman (Ind)
South Barwon	Liberal	Michael Crutchfield	**Alister Paterson** (Lib)	Stephen Chenery (Grn); Michael Gannon (Ind); Tierry Lauren (Ind); Jeffrey Paull (Dem)
Springvale	Labor	Tim Holding	John Campbell (Lib)	Robert Bisset (Ind); Barbara Liu-Hyland (Ind)
Sunshine	Labor	Telmo Languiller	Simon Morgan (Lib)	**Ian Baker** (Ind)
Swan Hill	National	Dallas Williams	**Barry Steggall** (Nat)	Leigh Bonney (Ind); Bill Croft (ON); Carl Ditterich (Ind); Bill Maher (Ind); Gerrit Schorel (Ind)
Thomastown	Labor	**Peter Batchelor**	Michael Gidley (Lib)	
Tullamarine	Liberal	Liz Beattie	**Bernie Finn** (Lib)	Pat Fraser (Grn); Russell Grenfell (ASP); John Mulholland (DLP)
Wantirna	Liberal	Chrys Abraham	**Kim Wells** (Lib)	
Warrandyte	Liberal	David Orr	**Phil Honeywood** (Lib)	Patti Roberts (NLP); Kate Stockdale (HPA)
Warrnambool	National	Roy Reekie	John Vogels* (Lib); Greg Walsh (Nat)	Gillian Blair (Grn); Maggie Lindop (Ind); Robert O'Brien (Ind); Barry Wilson (ARP)
Werribee	Labor	**Mary Gillett**	David McLaren (Lib)	Batman Backhouse (Ind); Gary Impson (Ind); Cynthia Manson (Grn)
Williamstown	Labor	**Steve Bracks**	Alan Evers-Buckland (Lib)	Noel Dyson (Ind)
Wimmera	National	Les Power	Garry Cross (Lib); Hugh Delahunty* (Nat)	Doug Hallam (Ind); Laurie Liston (Ind); Bob Mackley (ON)
Yan Yean	Labor	**Andre Haermeyer**	Heather Tivendale (Lib)	Byron Rigby (NLP); Lynlee Smith (Ind)

== Legislative Council ==
Sitting members are shown in bold text. Successful candidates are highlighted in the relevant colour. Where there is possible confusion, an asterisk (*) is also used.

Province	Held by	Labor candidates	Coalition candidates	Democrats candidates	Other candidates
Ballarat	Liberal	Dianne Hadden-Tregear	David Clark (Lib)	Geoff Lutz	
Ballarat	Liberal	John McQuilten	Helen Bath (Lib)		Charmaine Clarke (Grn); Jim Patterson (Ind)
Central Highlands	Liberal	Rob Mitchell	**Graeme Stoney** (Lib)		
Chelsea	Liberal	Bob Smith	**Sue Wilding** (Lib)	James Bennett	Michael Good (Ind)
Doutta Galla	Labor	Justin Madden	Philip Daw (Lib)		
East Yarra	Liberal	**Doug Walpole**	**Mark Birrell** (Lib)	Pierre Harcourt	
Eumemmerring	Liberal	Carlos Baldovino	Gordon Rich-Phillips (Lib)	Daniel Berk	Roz Blades (Ind); Lynne Dickson (CDP)
Geelong	Liberal	Elaine Carbines	**Bill Hartigan** (Lib)	Robyn Hodge	Adrian Whitehead (Grn)
Gippsland	Liberal	Don Wishart	**Philip Davis** (Lib)	Jo McCubbin	John O'Brien (Ind); Phil Seabrook (Ind); Doug Treasure (Ind)
Higinbotham	Liberal		**Chris Strong** (Lib)	Craig Tucker	
Jika Jika	Labor	Jenny Mikakos	Allan Dunn (Lib)		
Koonung	Liberal	Kelvin Legg	**Bruce Atkinson** (Lib)	Simone Alesich	Mick Kir (Grn)
Melbourne	Labor	Glenyys Romanes	Stuart McCraith (Lib)	Scott Handsaker	
Melbourne	Labor	Gavin Jennings	Khiet Nguyen (Lib)	Brendan Sharp	Gurm Sekhon (Grn)
Melbourne North	Labor	Marsha Thomson	George de Bono (Lib)		Malcolm McClure (Ind)
Melbourne North	Labor	Candy Broad	Monique Kraskov (Lib)		Claire Bradshaw (Ind)
Melbourne West	Labor	Kaye Darveniza	Angela Borg (Lib)	Diane Barnes	
Monash	Liberal	Jacki Willox	Andrea Coote (Lib)	Julie Peters	Roberto D'Andrea (Ind)
North Eastern	National	Linda Davis	**Bill Baxter** (Nat)	Benjamin Lee	
North Western	National	Judith Kidd	**Barry Bishop** (Nat)	Andrew van Diesen	
Silvan	Liberal	Mark Tunstall	Andrew Olexander (Lib)	Amanda Leeper	Ray Levick (CDP); Steve Raskovy (Ind)
South Eastern	Liberal	Michael Binney	**Ron Bowden** (Lib)	Richard Armstrong	Stuart Kingsford (Grn)
Templestowe	Liberal		**Bill Forwood** (Lib)	Bernie Millane	Robyn Evans (Grn)
Waverley	Liberal	Stuart Morris	**Andrew Brideson** (Lib)	Polly Morgan	
Western	National	Peter Mitchell	**Roger Hallam** (Nat)		Leigh McDonald (ARP)
