= Results of the 1999 Victorian state election (Legislative Council) =

Australian state election results

Victorian state election, 18 September 1999 Legislative Council << 1996–2002 >>
Enrolled voters	3,130,338				
Votes cast	2,909,727		Turnout	92.95	–1.13
Informal votes	97,949		Informal	3.37	+0.79
Summary of votes by party
Party	Primary votes	%	Swing	Seats won	Seats held
Labor	1,187,484	42.23	+1.74	8	14
Liberal	1,116,347	39.70	–4.17	11	24
National	204,587	7.28	+0.65	3	6
Democrats	190,940	6.79	+1.06	0	0
Greens	62,796	2.23	+2.23	0	0
Reform	6,617	0.24	+0.24	0	0
Christian Democrats	6,608	0.24	+0.04	0	0
Independent	36,399	1.29	+0.35	0	0
Total	2,811,778			22	44
Two-party-preferred
Labor	1,408,843	50.12	+4.08		
Liberal/National Coalition	1,402,338	49.88	–4.08		

This is a list of Legislative Council results for the Victorian 1999 state election. 22 of the 44 seats were contested.

== Results by province ==
=== Ballarat ===
1999 Victorian state election: Ballarat Province
Party	Candidate	Votes	%	±%
Labor	Dianne Hadden-Tregear	57,655	47.9	+6.4
Liberal	David Clark	55,834	46.4	−5.3
Democrats	Geoff Lutz	6,853	5.7	+1.8
Total formal votes		120,342	97.3	−0.9
Informal votes		3,383	2.7	+0.9
Turnout		123,725	92.6	
Two-party-preferred result
Labor	Dianne Hadden-Tregear	61,774	51.3	+5.7
Liberal	David Clark	58,568	48.7	−5.7
Labor gain from Liberal		Swing	+5.7	

=== Central Highlands ===
1999 Victorian state election Central Highlands Province
Party	Candidate	Votes	%	±%
Liberal	Graeme Stoney	70,353	53.3	−0.8
Labor	Rob Mitchell	61,686	46.7	+8.9
Total formal votes		132,039	96.8	−0.9
Informal votes		4,368	3.2	+0.9
Turnout		136,407	94.2	
Liberal hold		Swing	−4.3	

=== Chelsea ===
1999 Victorian state election: Chelsea Province
Party	Candidate	Votes	%	±%
Labor	Bob Smith	57,949	47.5	+5.3
Liberal	Sue Wilding	56,642	46.4	−4.3
Democrats	James Bennett	5,250	4.3	−0.4
Independent	Michael Good	2,185	1.8	+1.8
Total formal votes		122,026	96.4	−1.1
Informal votes		4,621	3.6	+1.1
Turnout		126,647	93.2	
Two-party-preferred result
Labor	Bob Smith	62,501	51.2	+4.5
Liberal	Sue Wilding	59,525	48.8	−4.5
Labor gain from Liberal		Swing	+4.5	

=== Doutta Galla ===
1999 Victorian state election: Doutta Galla Province
Party	Candidate	Votes	%	±%
Labor	Justin Madden	93,833	65.6	+7.8
Liberal	Philip Daw	49,202	34.4	−1.8
Total formal votes		143,035	95.1	−0.6
Informal votes		7,441	4.9	+0.6
Turnout		150,476	95.0	
Labor hold		Swing	+4.4	

=== East Yarra ===
1999 Victorian state election: East Yarra Province
Party	Candidate	Votes	%	±%
Liberal	Mark Birrell	72,041	56.8	−0.5
Labor	Doug Walpole	41,644	32.8	+2.6
Democrats	Pierre Harcourt	13,236	10.4	+1.5
Total formal votes		126,921	97.5	−0.8
Informal votes		3,308	2.5	+0.8
Turnout		130,229	92.1	
Two-party-preferred result
Liberal	Mark Birrell	76,560	60.3	−1.9
Labor	Doug Walpole	50,356	39.7	+1.9
Liberal hold		Swing	−1.9	

=== Eumemmerring ===
1999 Victorian state election: Eumemmerring Province
Party	Candidate	Votes	%	±%
Liberal	Gordon Rich-Phillips	65,426	45.4	−3.4
Labor	Carlos Baldovino	64,024	44.4	+1.4
Democrats	Daniel Berk	5,161	3.6	−0.5
Independent	Roz Blades	5,017	3.5	+3.5
Christian Democrats	Lynne Dickson	4,492	3.1	+0.6
Total formal votes		144,120	95.8	−1.0
Informal votes		6,243	4.2	+1.0
Turnout		150,363	94.3	
Two-party-preferred result
Liberal	Gordon Rich-Phillips	72,518	50.3	−2.5
Labor	Carlos Baldovino	71,602	49.7	+2.5
Liberal hold		Swing	−2.5	

=== Geelong ===
1999 Victorian state election: Geelong Province
Party	Candidate	Votes	%	±%
Liberal	Bill Hartigan	58,390	45.7	−5.5
Labor	Elaine Carbines	57,389	44.9	+1.6
Democrats	Robyn Hodge	6,540	5.1	+0.6
Greens	Adrian Whitehead	5,568	4.4	+4.4
Total formal votes		127,887	97.4	−0.3
Informal votes		3,350	2.6	+0.3
Turnout		131,237	94.6	
Two-party-preferred result
Labor	Elaine Carbines	65,790	51.4	+4.7
Liberal	Bill Hartigan	62,097	48.6	−4.7
Labor gain from Liberal		Swing	+4.7	

=== Gippsland ===
1999 Victorian state election: Gippsland Province
Party	Candidate	Votes	%	±%
Labor	Don Wishart	47,503	39.8	+6.2
Liberal	Philip Davis	46,447	38.9	+38.9
Independent	Doug Treasure	11,179	9.4	+9.4
Democrats	Jo McCubbin	6,802	5.7	+1.0
Independent	Phil Seabrook	3,957	3.3	+3.3
Independent	John O'Brien	3,516	2.9	+2.9
Total formal votes		119,404	96.5	−1.4
Informal votes		4,330	3.5	+1.4
Turnout		123,734	94.3	
Two-party-preferred result
Liberal	Philip Davis	60,046	50.3	+50.3
Labor	Don Wishart	59,358	49.7	+10.7
Liberal hold		Swing	+50.3	

=== Higinbotham ===
1999 Victorian state election: Higinbotham Province
Party	Candidate	Votes	%	±%
Liberal	Chris Strong	69,024	56.4	−0.4
Democrats	Craig Tucker	53,414	43.6	+35.8
Total formal votes		122,438	96.9	−1.0
Informal votes		3,892	3.1	+1.0
Turnout		126,330	92.8	
Liberal hold		Swing	−4.4	

=== Jika Jika ===
1999 Victorian state election: Jika Jika Province
Party	Candidate	Votes	%	±%
Labor	Jenny Mikakos	87,169	65.7	+10.5
Liberal	Allan Dunn	45,415	34.3	+0.3
Total formal votes		132,584	96.1	−0.3
Informal votes		5,390	3.9	+0.3
Turnout		137,974	93.4	
Labor hold		Swing	+2.9	

=== Koonung ===
1999 Victorian state election: Koonung Province
Party	Candidate	Votes	%	±%
Liberal	Bruce Atkinson	71,158	53.3	−3.2
Labor	Kelvin Legg	51,052	38.2	+2.7
Democrats	Simone Alesich	6,908	5.2	−0.4
Total formal votes		133,598	97.2	−0.7
Informal votes		3,915	2.8	+0.7
Turnout		137,513	93.7	
Two-party-preferred result
Liberal	Bruce Atkinson	75,248	56.4	−3.2
Labor	Kelvin Legg	58,137	43.6	+3.2
Liberal hold		Swing	−3.2	

=== Melbourne ===
1999 Victorian state election: Melbourne Province
Party	Candidate	Votes	%	±%
Labor	Glenyys Romanes	73,484	56.0	+1.1
Liberal	Stuart McCraith	44,220	33.7	+0.2
Democrats	Scott Handsaker	13,517	10.3	+1.9
Total formal votes		131,221	96.0	−0.9
Informal votes		5,460	4.0	+0.9
Turnout		136,681	89.7	
Two-party-preferred result
Labor	Glenyys Romanes	83,865	63.9	+0.1
Liberal	Stuart McCraith	47,313	36.1	−0.1
Labor hold		Swing	+0.1	

=== Melbourne North ===
1999 Victorian state election: Melbourne North Province
Party	Candidate	Votes	%	±%
Labor	Marsha Thomson	78,663	62.6	+4.9
Liberal	George De Bono	42,115	33.5	−2.5
Independent	Malcolm McClure	4,909	3.9	+3.9
Total formal votes		125,687	94.9	−1.4
Informal votes		6,777	5.1	+1.4
Turnout		132,464	92.8	
Two-party-preferred result
Labor	Marsha Thomson	81,196	64.6	+2.9
Liberal	George De Bono	44,484	35.4	−2.9
Labor hold		Swing	+2.9	

=== Melbourne West ===
1999 Victorian state election: Melbourne West Province
Party	Candidate	Votes	%	±%
Labor	Kaye Darveniza	79,460	60.8	+13.2
Liberal	Angela Borg	43,561	33.3	−0.2
Democrats	Diane Bames	7,682	5.9	+2.8
Total formal votes		130,703	95.8	−0.4
Informal votes		5,801	4.2	+0.4
Turnout		136,504	92.9	
Two-party-preferred result
Labor	Kaye Darveniza	84,297	64.5	+3.3
Liberal	Angela Borg	46,404	35.5	−3.3
Labor hold		Swing	+3.3	

=== Monash ===
1999 Victorian state election: Monash Province
Party	Candidate	Votes	%	±%
Liberal	Andrea Coote	62,295	51.2	−0.5
Labor	Jacki Willox	45,926	37.8	−0.7
Democrats	Julie Peters	9,211	7.6	+1.0
Independent	Roberto D'Andrea	4,165	3.4	+3.4
Total formal votes		121,597	96.8	−0.8
Informal votes		4,009	3.2	+0.8
Turnout		125,606	82.6	
Two-party-preferred result
Liberal	Andrea Coote	67,158	55.3	+0.5
Labor	Jacki Willox	54,246	44.7	−0.5
Liberal hold		Swing	+0.5	

=== North Eastern ===
1999 Victorian state election: North Eastern Province
Party	Candidate	Votes	%	±%
National	Bill Baxter	70,020	56.4	+19.4
Labor	Linda Davis	43,958	35.4	+9.8
Democrats	Benjamin Lee	10,148	8.2	+4.2
Total formal votes		124,126	97.0	−0.8
Informal votes		3,889	3.0	+0.8
Turnout		128,015	93.8	
Two-party-preferred result
National	Bill Baxter	74,727	60.2	−9.1
Labor	Linda Davis	49,395	39.8	+9.1
National hold		Swing	−9.1	

=== North Western ===
1999 Victorian state election: North Western Province
Party	Candidate	Votes	%	±%
National	Barry Bishop	62,789	51.6	−5.6
Labor	Judith Kidd	49,952	41.1	+7.3
Democrats	Andrew Van Diesen	8,855	7.3	+1.6
Total formal votes		121,596	97.7	−0.4
Informal votes		2,913	2.3	+0.4
Turnout		124,509	94.1	
Two-party-preferred result
National	Barry Bishop	67,257	55.3	−6.3
Labor	Judith Kidd	54,332	44.7	+6.3
National hold		Swing	−6.3	

=== Silvan ===
1999 Victorian state election: Silvan Province
Party	Candidate	Votes	%	±%
Liberal	Andrew Olexander	66,992	53.1	−2.9
Labor	Mark Tunstall	48,266	38.2	+3.5
Democrats	Amanda Leeper	7,375	5.8	−0.1
Christian Democrats	Ray Levick	2,116	1.7	+1.7
Independent	Steve Raskovy	1,471	1.2	+0.4
Total formal votes		126,220	97.2	−0.6
Informal votes		3,685	2.8	+0.6
Turnout		129,905	93.9	
Two-party-preferred result
Liberal	Andrew Olexander	71,662	56.8	−3.6
Labor	Mark Tunstall	54,475	43.2	+3.6
Liberal hold		Swing	−3.6	

=== South Eastern ===
1999 Victorian state election: South Eastern Province
Party	Candidate	Votes	%	±%
Liberal	Ron Bowden	70,597	52.6	−4.0
Labor	Michael Binney	51,147	38.1	+2.7
Democrats	Richard Armstrong	6,551	4.9	0.0
Greens	Stuart Kingsford	5,972	4.4	+4.4
Total formal votes		134,267	97.2	−0.6
Informal votes		3,807	2.8	+0.6
Turnout		138,074	94.1	
Two-party-preferred result
Liberal	Ron Bowden	76,088	56.7	−3.4
Labor	Michael Binney	58,148	43.3	+3.4
Liberal hold		Swing	−3.4	

=== Templestowe ===
1999 Victorian state election: Templestowe Province
Party	Candidate	Votes	%	±%
Liberal	Bill Forwood	69,383	53.5	−1.3
Greens	Robyn Evans	46,776	36.1	+36.1
Democrats	Bernie Millane	13,568	10.5	+1.8
Total formal votes		129,727	97.0	−0.7
Informal votes		3,944	3.0	+0.7
Turnout		133,671	93.3	
Two-candidate-preferred result
Liberal	Bill Forwood	72,294	55.7	−3.5
Greens	Robyn Evans	57,426	44.3	+44.3
Liberal hold		Swing	−3.5	

=== Waverley ===
1999 Victorian state election: Waverley Province
Party	Candidate	Votes	%	±%
Liberal	Andrew Brideson	57,252	47.0	−3.9
Labor	Stuart Morris	54,573	44.8	+4.3
Democrats	Polly Morgan	9,869	8.1	+1.2
Total formal votes		121,694	96.3	−1.1
Informal votes		4,686	3.7	+1.1
Turnout		126,380	93.1	
Two-party-preferred result
Liberal	Andrew Brideson	61,735	50.7	−4.1
Labor	Stuart Morris	59,959	49.3	+4.1
Liberal hold		Swing	−4.1	

=== Western ===
1999 Victorian state election: Western Province
Party	Candidate	Votes	%	±%
National	Roger Hallam	71,778	59.5	+59.5
Labor	Peter Mitchell	42,151	35.0	+4.4
Reform	Leigh McDonald	6,617	5.5	+5.5
Total formal votes		120,546	97.8	−0.4
Informal votes		2,737	2.2	+0.4
Turnout		123,283	95.4	
Two-party-preferred result
National	Roger Hallam	74,660	61.9	+61.9
Labor	Peter Mitchell	45,884	38.1	+2.8
National hold		Swing	+61.9	

== By-elections ==
1999 Victorian Legislative Council by-elections
- 18 September 1999

3 seats in the Legislative Council
	First party	Second party
Party	Labor	Liberal
Seats before	2	1
Seats won	3	0
Seat change	▲1	▼1

There were a total of 3 Legislative Council by-elections that took place on election day following the resignation of MLCs elected at the 1996 election.

=== Ballarat ===
1999 Victorian state election: Ballarat by-election
Party	Candidate	Votes	%	±%
Labor	John McQuilten	58,904	48.4	+6.8
Liberal	Helen Bath	55,191	45.3	−6.3
Greens	Charmaine Clarke	5,233	4.3	+4.3
Independent	Jim Patterson	2,423	2.0	+2.0
Total formal votes		121,751	97.1	−1.1
Informal votes		3,631	2.9	+1.1
Turnout		125,382	93.9	
Two-party-preferred result
Labor	John McQuilten	63,589	52.2	+6.6
Liberal	Helen Bath	58,162	47.8	−6.6
Labor gain from Liberal		Swing	+6.6	

This election was caused by the vacancy following the resignation of Rob Knowles, who unsuccessfully contested the lower house seat of Gisborne.

=== Melbourne ===
1999 Victorian state election: Melbourne by-election
Party	Candidate	Votes	%	±%
Labor	Gavin Jennings	69,811	53.3	−1.6
Liberal	Khiet Nguyen	41,634	31.8	−1.8
Greens	Gurm Sekhon	11,126	8.5	+8.5
Democrats	Brendan Sharp	8,437	6.4	−2.0
Total formal votes		131,008	95.9	−1.0
Informal votes		5,555	4.1	+1.0
Turnout		136,563	89.6	
Two-party-preferred result
Labor	Gavin Jennings	82,617	63.1	−0.7
Liberal	Khiet Nguyen	48,336	36.9	+0.7
Labor hold		Swing	−0.7	

This election was caused by the vacancy following the resignation of Barry Pullen.

=== Melbourne North ===
1999 Victorian state election: Melbourne North by-election
Party	Candidate	Votes	%	±%
Labor	Candy Broad	79,955	63.6	+6.0
Liberal	Monique Kraskov	40,444	32.2	−3.8
Independent	Claire Bradshaw	5,255	4.2	+4.2
Total formal votes		125,654	94.9	−1.5
Informal votes		6,798	5.1	+1.5
Turnout		132,452	92.8	
Two-party-preferred result
Labor	Candy Broad	83,034	66.1	+4.4
Liberal	Monique Kraskov	42,607	33.9	−4.4
Labor hold		Swing	+4.4	

This election was caused by the vacancy following the resignation of Caroline Hogg.

== See also ==
- 1999 Victorian state election
- Candidates of the 1999 Victorian state election
