= Electoral results for the district of Gisborne =

Victoria, Australia, district election results

This is a list of electoral results for the Electoral district of Gisborne in Victorian state elections.

== Members for Gisborne ==
Member	Party	Term
Julian Doyle	Liberal	1967–1971
Athol Guy	Liberal	1971–1979
Tom Reynolds	Liberal	1979–1999
Jo Duncan	Labor	1999–2002

== Election results ==
=== Elections in the 1990s ===
1999 Victorian state election: Gisborne
Party	Candidate	Votes	%	±%
Liberal	Rob Knowles	14,084	41.9	−13.8
Labor	Jo Duncan	13,589	40.4	−0.4
Independent	Deb Dunn	3,394	10.1	+10.1
Democrats	Russell Mowatt	1,260	3.7	+3.7
Greens	Lawrie Hall	678	2.0	+2.0
Independent	George Reynolds	643	1.9	+1.9
Total formal votes		33,648	97.2	−0.9
Informal votes		981	2.8	+0.9
Turnout		34,629	95.2	
Two-party-preferred result
Labor	Jo Duncan	17,371	51.6	+9.4
Liberal	Rob Knowles	16,277	48.4	−9.4
Labor gain from Liberal		Swing	+9.4	

1996 Victorian state election: Gisborne
Party	Candidate	Votes	%	±%
Liberal	Tom Reynolds	17,630	55.7	−7.2
Labor	Mark Ridgeway	12,918	40.8	+3.7
Call to Australia	Frank Colosimo	667	2.1	+2.1
Natural Law	Mark Brady	457	1.4	+1.4
Total formal votes		31,672	98.0	+0.9
Informal votes		631	2.0	−0.9
Turnout		32,303	95.6	
Two-party-preferred result
Liberal	Tom Reynolds	18,293	57.8	−5.1
Labor	Mark Ridgeway	13,337	42.2	+5.1
Liberal hold		Swing	−5.1	

1992 Victorian state election: Gisborne
Party	Candidate	Votes	%	±%
Liberal	Tom Reynolds	18,478	62.9	+7.7
Labor	Barry Rowe	10,905	37.1	−5.5
Total formal votes		29,383	97.1	−0.4
Informal votes		865	2.9	+0.4
Turnout		30,248	95.6	
Liberal hold		Swing	+5.5	

=== Elections in the 1980s ===
1988 Victorian state election: Gisborne
Party	Candidate	Votes	%	±%
Liberal	Tom Reynolds	18,061	54.46	−3.06
Labor	Eric Dearricott	13,964	42.11	−0.37
Independent	Glenn Torney	1,138	3.43	+3.43
Total formal votes		33,163	97.46	−0.83
Informal votes		866	2.54	+0.83
Turnout		34,029	93.46	−1.28
Two-party-preferred result
Liberal	Tom Reynolds	18,697	56.38	−1.14
Labor	Eric Dearricott	14,466	43.62	+1.14
Liberal hold		Swing	−1.14	

1985 Victorian state election: Gisborne
Party	Candidate	Votes	%	±%
Liberal	Tom Reynolds	16,400	57.5	+10.5
Labor	Douglas Bishop	12,114	42.5	−2.8
Total formal votes		28,514	98.3	
Informal votes		495	1.7	
Turnout		29,009	94.7	
Liberal hold		Swing	+6.5	

1982 Victorian state election: Gisborne
Party	Candidate	Votes	%	±%
Liberal	Tom Reynolds	16,473	49.1	−2.9
Labor	Philip Coman	15,921	47.4	−0.6
Independent	Kottarammukallel Sebastian	1,189	3.5	+3.5
Total formal votes		33,583	98.4	+1.0
Informal votes		548	1.6	−1.0
Turnout		34,131	94.5	+0.3
Two-party-preferred result
Liberal	Tom Reynolds	17,092	50.9	−1.1
Labor	Philip Coman	16,491	49.1	+1.1
Liberal hold		Swing	−1.1	

=== Elections in the 1970s ===
1979 Victorian state election: Gisborne
Party	Candidate	Votes	%	±%
Liberal	Tom Reynolds	15,284	52.0	−0.5
Labor	Ian Elliott	14,098	48.0	+13.4
Total formal votes		29,382	97.4	−0.9
Informal votes		774	2.6	+0.9
Turnout		30,156	94.2	+0.1
Liberal hold		Swing	−12.2	

1976 Victorian state election: Gisborne
Party	Candidate	Votes	%	±%
Liberal	Athol Guy	13,159	52.5	+2.2
Labor	George Beardsley	8,669	34.6	−1.7
National	Robert Cooper	1,738	6.9	+3.0
Democratic Labor	Richard McManus	1,484	5.9	−3.4
Total formal votes		25,050	98.3	
Informal votes		439	1.7	
Turnout		25,489	94.1	
Two-party-preferred result
Liberal	Athol Guy	16,083	64.2	+2.3
Labor	George Beardsley	8,967	35.8	−2.3
Liberal hold		Swing	+2.3	

1973 Victorian state election: Gisborne
Party	Candidate	Votes	%	±%
Liberal	Athol Guy	14,810	47.2	0.0
Labor	Ernest Jamieson	12,579	40.1	+2.0
Democratic Labor	Maurice Flynn	2,736	8.7	−4.3
Country	Peter Holzgrefe	1,258	4.0	+4.0
Total formal votes		31,383	97.7	+0.6
Informal votes		736	2.3	−0.6
Turnout		32,119	92.7	−1.9
Two-party-preferred result
Liberal	Athol Guy	18,243	58.1	−1.7
Labor	Ernest Jamieson	13,140	41.9	+1.7
Liberal hold		Swing	−1.7	

1971 Gisborne state by-election
Party	Candidate	Votes	%	±%
Labor	Ernest Jamieson	9,386	41.6	+3.5
Liberal	Athol Guy	8,262	36.6	−10.6
Democratic Labor	Maurice Flynn	3,367	14.9	+1.9
Independent Country	Peter Holzgrefe	1,540	6.8	+6.8
Total formal votes		22,555	97.9	+0.8
Informal votes		494	2.1	−0.8
Turnout		23,049	85.3	−9.3
Two-party-preferred result
Liberal	Athol Guy	12,363	54.8	−5.0
Labor	Ernest Jamieson	10,192	45.2	+5.0
Liberal hold		Swing	−5.0	

1970 Victorian state election: Gisborne
Party	Candidate	Votes	%	±%
Liberal	Julian Doyle	10,473	47.2	+5.0
Labor	Robert Harrison	8,457	38.1	+8.6
Democratic Labor	Raymond Studham	2,885	13.0	−3.4
Independent	Roy Hartley	389	1.7	+1.7
Total formal votes		22,204	97.1	+2.2
Informal votes		658	2.9	−2.2
Turnout		22,862	94.6	+1.8
Two-party-preferred result
Liberal	Julian Doyle	13,282	59.8	−5.4
Labor	Robert Harrison	8,922	40.2	+5.4
Liberal hold		Swing	−5.4	

=== Elections in the 1960s ===
1967 Victorian state election: Gisborne
Party	Candidate	Votes	%	±%
Liberal	Julian Doyle	7,398	42.2	+1.1
Labor	Michael Nolan	5,166	29.5	−5.8
Democratic Labor	John McMahon	2,872	16.4	−4.2
Country	George Duncan	1,847	10.5	+10.5
Independent	Peter Hatherley	61	0.4	+0.4
Independent	Derek Hobler	52	0.3	+0.3
Independent	Jeffrey Hatswell	49	0.3	+0.3
Independent	Warren Nicol	46	0.3	+0.3
Independent	Peter Kensett	25	0.1	+0.1
Total formal votes		17,516	94.9	
Informal votes		948	5.1	
Turnout		18,464	92.8	
Two-party-preferred result
Liberal	Julian Doyle	11,422	65.2	+3.4
Labor	Michael Nolan	6,094	34.8	−3.4
Liberal hold		Swing	+3.4	
