= List of mayors of Ballarat =

This is a list of the Mayors of the City of Ballarat, a local government area and the third largest city in Victoria, Australia.

== Ballarat Mayors (1863–1921) ==
#	Mayor	Term
	Mathew Campbell	1863–1864
	Joseph Attwood Doane	1864–1865
	Thomas Davey	1866–1868
	James McDowall	1868–1869
	Thomas Cowan	1869–1870
	Henry Black Chalmers	1870–1871
	Robert Lewis	1871–1872
	Frederick Moses Claxton	1871–1873
	John Henry Williams	1873–1874
	William Collard Smith	1874–1875
	Daniel Brophy	1876–1877
	Frederick Moses Claxton	1876–1877
	John Wightman Gray	1877–1878
	Henry Leggo	1876–1879
	Alexander Thomas Morrison	1879–1880
	Robert Lewis	1880–1881
	John Noble Wilson	1881–1882
	Frederick Moses Claxton	1882–1883
	John Hickman	1883–1884
	Alexander Thomas Morrison	1884–1885
	Charles Slater	1885–1886
	Thomas Houlden Thompson	1886–1887
	William Collard Smith	1887–1888
	John Gordon McDonald	1888–1889
	William Little	1889–1890
	John Hickman	1890–1891
	Charles Collett Shoppee	1891–1892
	David Cooke	1892–1893
	Thomas Houlden Thompson	1893–1894
	Edward Morey	1894–1895
	John Gordon McDonald	1895–1896
	Alexander Bell	1896–1897
	Charles Collett Shoppe	1897–1898
	Henry Francis Elliot	1898–1899
	John Heinz	1899–1900
	John Whykes	1900–1901
	James Job Brokenshire	1901–1902
	Charles Collett Shoppe	1902–1903
	Richard Pearse	1903–1904
	John Martin Barker	1904–1905
	John Whykes	1905–1906
	James Job Brokenshire	1906–1907
	Frederick Brawn	1907–1908
	Richard Pearse	1908–1909
	William Duiguid Hill	1909–1910
	Thomas Hollway	1910–1911
	John Martin Barker	1911–1912
	George Crocker	1912–1913
	James Job Brokenshire	1913–1914
	Richard Pearse	1914–1915
	Frederick Brawn	1915–1916
	William Duiguid Hill	1916–1917
	Alexander Bell	1917–1918
	Thomas Hollway	1918–1919
	George Crocker	1919–1920
	William Duiguid Hill	1920–1921

== Ballarat East Mayors (1863–1921) ==
#	Mayor	Term
	John Fussell	1863–1864
	George Glendinning	1864–1866
	Emmanuel Steinfeld	1866–1869
	Edward Eastwood	1869–1871
	James Ivey	1871–1872
	John Kirkland Baird	1872–1873
	Henry Josephs	1873–1874
	James Russell	1874–1875
	James Long	1875–1877
	David Turpie	1877–1878
	James Long	1878–1879
	William Scott	1879–1880
	William Robertson	1880–1881
	Theophilus Williams	1881–1882
	John Ferguson	1882–1884
	Thomas Walker	1884–1885
	William Scott	1885–1886
	James Russell	1886–1887
	Theophilus Williams	1887–1888
	John Roberts Elsworth	1888–1889
	Edward Murphy	1889–1890
	William Gale	1890–1891
	John Nankiville Dunn	1891–1892
	Isaiah Pearce	1892–1893
	John Larter	1893–1894
	Theophilus Williams	1894–1895
	John Roberts Elsworth	1895–1896
	William Denholm McKee	1897–1897
	Joseph Peady	1897–1898
	Edward Murphy	1898–1899
	John Nankiville Dunn	1899–1900
	Isaiah Pearce	1900–1901
	Charles Johnston	1901–1902
	Joseph Mathais Kline	1902–1903
	William Denholm McKee	1903–1904
	John Roberts Elsworth	1904–1905
	John Ritchie	1905–1906
	John Nankiville Dunn	1906–1907
	Isaiah Pearce	1907–1908
	Abraham Levy	1908–1909
	James McNeil	1909–1910
	Alexander MacKenzie	1910–1911
	Frank Penhalluriack	1911–1912
	John Nankiville Dunn	1912–1913
	Alfred James Pittard	1913–1914
	Isaiah Pearce	1914–1915
	William James Hoare	1915–1916
	Abraham Levy	1916–1917
	Henry Brown George	1917–1918
	Alexander MacKenzie	1918–1919
	William Richards	1919–1920
	Alfred James Pittard	1920–1921

== Amalgamated Municipality: City of Ballarat ==
#	Mayor	Term
	William Roberts Elsworth	1921–1923
	Robert John Cooke	1923–1924
	Abraham Levy	1924–1925
	Alfred Ernest Nicholson	1925–1926
	Alfred James Pittard	1926–1927
	Alexander MacKenzie	1927–1928
	Joseph Pryor	1928–1929
	George Bolster	1929–1930
	Arthur Richards Stewart	1930–1931
	James Harrison	1931–1932
	William James Hoare	1932–1933
	Alfred John Darling	1933–1934
	Lazarus Lederman	1934–1935
	Michael Martin	1935–1936
	Joseph Pryor	1936–1937
	John Henry Trekardo	1937–1938
	Alexander Mercer King	1938–1940
	Michael Martin	1940–1941
	William John Perking	1941–1942
	Alexander MacKenzie	1941–1943
	Joseph Pryor	1943–1944
	Robert Hamlin Ramsay	1944–1945
	Herbert Leslie Coburn	1945–1946
	Alan Pittard	1946–1947
	George Stewart	1947–1948
	Frederick Charlton Wray	1948–1949
	Nathaniel Thomas Callow	1949–1950
	John Clymo Rowe	1950–1951
	William Ernest Roff	1951–1952
	Arthur Nicholson	1952–1953
	Francis John Cutts	1953–1954
	Alan Pittard	1954–1955
	Nathaniel Thomas Callow	1955–1956
	Kenneth Crago Webb	1956–1957
	John Allan Chisholm	1957–1958
	Gordon Lincoln Scott	1958–1959
	Frederick Wilson Oliver	1959–1960
	Alan Arthur Nicholson	1960–1961
	Arthur Dexter Mason	1961–1962
	Alexander Elliot Mills	1962–1963
	Kenneth Crago Webb	1963–1964
	John Allan Chisholm	1964–1965
	William Ernest Roff	1965–1966
	Leslie Kennedy	1966–1967
	Sir Arthur Nicholson	1967–1968
	Maurice James Brown	1968–1969
	Alexander Elliot Mills	1969–1970
	Kenneth Crago Webb	1970–1971
	John Allan Chisholm	1971–1972
	John Francis McKay	1972–1973
	Alexander Charles Rizzoli	1973–1974
	Sir Arthur Nicholson	1974–1975
	Maurice James Brown	1975–1976
	Jessie Margaret Scott	1976–1977
	John Allan Chisholm	1977–1978
	Melton Foo	1978–1979
	John Francis McKay	1979–1980
	Alfred Emerson Hancock	1980–1981
	Don Woodward	1981–1982
	Melton Foo	1982–1983
	Bryan Crebbin	1983–1984
	Bruce McKnight	1984–1985
	Bryan Crebbin	1985–1986
	Jim Reeves	1986–1987
	Neil Steinmann	1987–1988
	Wanda Chapman	1988–1989
	Don Woodward	1989–1990
	Vashti Lloyd	1990–1991
	Frank Williams	1991–1992
	James Coghlan	1992–1993
	Geoff Howard	1993–1994

== Commissioners (1994–1995) ==
#	Commissioners	Term
	John Sharpham (Chief Commissioner)	1994-1994
	Vern Robson (Chief Commissioner)	1994–1995
	Bruce Clark (Assistant Commissioner)	1994–1995
	Malcolm Lee (Assistant Commissioner)	1994–1995

== City of Ballarat Mayors since 1995 ==
#	Mayor	Term
	James Coghlan	1996-97
	John Barnes	1999-2001, 2004–2005
	David Vendy	2001-02, 2002–03, 2003–04, 2004–05, 2005–06, 2006–07, 2007–08
	Stephen Jones	2007–2008
	Judy Verlin	2008–2009
	Craig Fletcher	2010–2011
	Mark Harris	2011-2012
	John Burt	2012-2013
	Josh Morris	2013-2014
	John Philips	2014-2015
	Des Hudson	2015-2016
	Samantha McIntosh	2016-2017
	Samantha McIntosh	2017-2018
	Samantha McIntosh	2018-2019
	Ben Taylor	2019-2020
	Daniel Moloney	2020-2021, 2021-2022
	Des Hudson	2022-2024
	Tracey Hargreaves	2024-present
