= Electoral results for the district of Ballarat East =

Australian district election results

This is a list of electoral results for the electoral district of Ballarat East in Victorian state elections.

== Members for Ballarat East ==
First incarnation (1859–1889)
Member	Party	Term
John Humffray	Unaligned	1859–1864
John Cathie	Unaligned	1859–1864
Charles Jones	Unaligned	1864–1867
Charles Dyte	Unaligned	1864–1871
John Humffray	Unaligned	1868–1871
John James	Unaligned	1871–1886
Robert Walsh	Unaligned	1871–1874
Townsend McDermott	Unaligned	1874–1877
Daniel Brophy	Unaligned	1877–1880
James Russell	Unaligned	1880
Daniel Brophy	Unaligned	1880–1883
James Russell	Unaligned	1883–1889
Edward Murphy	Unaligned	1886–1889
Second incarnation (1889–1927)
Member	Party	Term
John Dunn	Comm Liberal	1889–1894
Robert McGregor	Comm Liberal	1894–1924
Robert McGregor	Nationalist	1894–1924
William McAdam	Labor	1924–1927
Third incarnation (1992–present)
Member	Party	Term
Barry Traynor	Liberal	1992–1999
Geoff Howard	Labor	1999–2014

== Election results ==
=== Elections in the 2010s ===
2010 Victorian state election: Ballarat East
Party	Candidate	Votes	%	±%
Liberal	Ben Taylor	15,758	43.40	+9.80
Labor	Geoff Howard	14,076	38.77	−4.18
Greens	Linda Zibell	5,363	14.77	+3.01
Family First	Gary Greville	1,109	3.05	−2.03
Total formal votes		36,306	95.69	−0.47
Informal votes		1,636	4.31	+0.47
Turnout		37,942	93.50	+1.58
Two-party-preferred result
Labor	Geoff Howard	18,702	51.51	−5.13
Liberal	Ben Taylor	17,604	48.49	+5.13
Labor hold		Swing	−5.13	

=== Elections in the 2000s ===
2006 Victorian state election: Ballarat East
Party	Candidate	Votes	%	±%
Labor	Geoff Howard	14,292	42.95	−5.87
Liberal	Geoff Hayes	11,183	33.60	−2.44
Greens	Michele Harvie	3,915	11.76	−1.36
Independent	Dianne Hadden	2,199	6.61	+6.61
Family First	Grace Bailey	1,690	5.08	+5.08
Total formal votes		33,279	96.16	−0.82
Informal votes		1,328	3.84	+0.82
Turnout		34,607	91.92	−2.27
Two-party-preferred result
Labor	Geoff Howard	18,850	56.64	−0.97
Liberal	Geoff Hayes	14,429	43.36	+0.97
Labor hold		Swing	−0.97	

2002 Victorian state election: Ballarat East
Party	Candidate	Votes	%	±%
Labor	Geoff Howard	16,268	48.82	−5.07
Liberal	Gerard FitzGerald	12,010	36.04	−10.27
Greens	Scott Kinnear	4,373	13.12	+13.12
Independent	Suresh Pathy	402	1.21	+1.21
Citizens Electoral Council	Valiant Halborg	271	0.81	+0.81
Total formal votes		33,324	96.98	−0.72
Informal votes		1,037	3.02	+0.72
Turnout		34,361	94.19	
Two-party-preferred result
Labor	Geoff Howard	19,300	57.80	+4.11
Liberal	Gerard FitzGerald	14,092	42.20	−4.11
Labor hold		Swing	+4.11	

=== Elections in the 1990s ===
1999 Victorian state election: Ballarat East
Party	Candidate	Votes	%	±%
Labor	Geoff Howard	16,100	53.7	+3.7
Liberal	Barry Traynor	13,886	46.3	−3.7
Total formal votes		29,986	97.7	−0.7
Informal votes		706	2.3	+0.7
Turnout		30,692	94.4	
Labor gain from Liberal		Swing	+3.7	

1996 Victorian state election: Ballarat East
Party	Candidate	Votes	%	±%
Liberal	Barry Traynor	14,232	48.3	−1.9
Labor	Frank Sheehan	14,110	47.9	+2.4
Independent	Ralph Manno	481	1.6	+1.6
Call to Australia	Ray Suttie	415	1.4	+1.4
Natural Law	Alan McDonald	241	0.8	+0.8
Total formal votes		29,479	98.4	+0.9
Informal votes		473	1.6	−0.9
Turnout		29,952	94.8	
Two-party-preferred result
Liberal	Barry Traynor	14,736	50.1	−1.6
Labor	Frank Sheehan	14,709	49.9	+1.6
Liberal hold		Swing	−1.6	

1992 Victorian state election: Ballarat East
Party	Candidate	Votes	%	±%
Liberal	Barry Traynor	14,133	50.1	+5.9
Labor	Frank Sheehan	12,818	45.5	−0.5
Independent	Petra Krjutschkow	1,242	4.4	+4.4
Total formal votes		28,193	97.5	+0.0
Informal votes		716	2.5	−0.0
Turnout		28,909	95.8	
Two-party-preferred result
Liberal	Barry Traynor	14,529	51.6	+1.1
Labor	Frank Sheehan	13,654	48.4	−1.1
Liberal hold		Swing	+1.1	

=== Elections in the 1920s ===
1924 Victorian state election: Ballarat East
Party	Candidate	Votes	%	±%
Nationalist	Robert McGregor	3,533	48.9	−10.3
Labor	William McAdam	3,403	47.1	+6.3
Independent Labor	Alfred Elliott	290	4.0	+4.0
Total formal votes		7,226	98.7	−0.5
Informal votes		97	1.3	+0.5
Turnout		7,323	75.1	+3.9
Two-party-preferred result
Labor	William McAdam	3,613	50.0	+9.2
Nationalist	Robert McGregor	3,609	50.0	−9.2
Labor gain from Nationalist		Swing	+9.2	

1921 Victorian state election: Ballarat East
Party	Candidate	Votes	%	±%
Nationalist	Robert McGregor	4,055	59.2	+5.1
Labor	John Kean	2,797	40.8	−5.1
Total formal votes		6,852	99.2	+1.7
Informal votes		53	0.8	−1.7
Turnout		6,905	71.2	−3.5
Nationalist hold		Swing	+5.1	

1920 Victorian state election: Ballarat East
Party	Candidate	Votes	%	±%
Nationalist	Robert McGregor	3,952	54.1	−1.2
Labor	Walter Dalton	3,357	45.9	+1.2
Total formal votes		7,309	97.5	+0.5
Informal votes		189	2.5	−0.5
Turnout		7,498	74.7	+4.1
Nationalist hold		Swing	−1.2	

=== Elections in the 1910s ===
1917 Victorian state election: Ballarat East
Party	Candidate	Votes	%	±%
Nationalist	Robert McGregor	3,788	55.3	+1.7
Labor	Andrew McKissock	3,064	44.7	−1.7
Total formal votes		6,852	97.0	−1.5
Informal votes		211	3.0	+1.5
Turnout		7,063	70.6	+0.4
Nationalist hold		Swing	+1.7	

1914 Victorian state election: Ballarat East
Party	Candidate	Votes	%	±%
Liberal	Robert McGregor	4,079	53.6	−6.5
Labor	James Harrison	3,524	46.4	+10.0
Total formal votes		7,603	98.5	+0.3
Informal votes		113	1.5	−0.3
Turnout		7,716	70.2	−1.6
Liberal hold		Swing	−8.3	

1911 Victorian state election: Ballarat East
Party	Candidate	Votes	%	±%
Liberal	Robert McGregor	4,377	60.1	+7.6
Labor	David Russell	2,651	36.4	−11.1
Independent	James McNeil	259	3.6	+3.6
Total formal votes		7,287	98.2	−1.3
Informal votes		133	1.8	+1.3
Turnout		7,420	71.8	+12.3
Two-party-preferred result
Liberal	Robert McGregor		61.9	+9.4
Labor	David Russell		38.1	−9.4
Liberal hold		Swing	+9.4	

- Two party preferred vote was estimated.
