= Electoral results for the district of Buninyong =

Australian district election results

This is a list of electoral results for the electoral district of Buninyong in Victorian state elections.

== Members for Buninyong ==
Member	Party	Term
Geoff Howard	Labor	2014–2018
Michaela Settle	Labor	2018–2022

== Election results ==
=== Elections in the 2010s ===
2018 Victorian state election: Buninyong
Party	Candidate	Votes	%	±%
Labor	Michaela Settle	18,965	49.1	+5.6
Liberal	Andrew Kilmartin	11,921	30.9	−4.1
Greens	Linda Zibell	3,540	9.2	−1.7
Animal Justice	Wendy Morrison	1,580	4.1	+4.1
Independent	Dianne Colbert	1,285	3.3	+3.3
Independent	Brendan Eckel	467	1.2	+1.2
Independent	Lindsay Watters	436	1.1	+1.1
Victorian Socialists	Jane McKendrick	397	1.0	+1.0
Total formal votes		38,591	92.4	−2.8
Informal votes		3,159	7.6	+2.8
Turnout		41,750	91.6	−2.7
Two-party-preferred result
Labor	Michaela Settle	24,108	62.24	+5.88
Liberal	Andrew Kilmartin	14,627	37.76	−5.88
Labor hold		Swing	+5.88	

2014 Victorian state election: Buninyong
Party	Candidate	Votes	%	±%
Labor	Geoff Howard	15,984	43.5	+2.7
Liberal	Ben Taylor	12,829	35.0	−7.5
Greens	Tony Goodfellow	4,017	10.9	−0.4
National	Sonia Smith	2,301	6.3	+5.5
Family First	Keith Geyer	950	2.6	−0.7
Country Alliance	James Keays	622	1.7	+0.6
Total formal votes		36,703	95.2	−0.1
Informal votes		1,852	4.8	+0.1
Turnout		38,555	94.3	+5.4
Two-party-preferred result
Labor	Geoff Howard	20,697	56.4	+4.8
Liberal	Ben Taylor	16,006	43.6	−4.8
Labor hold		Swing	+4.8	
