= Electoral results for the district of Macedon =

Victoria, Australia, district election results

This is a list of electoral results for the Electoral district of Macedon in Victorian state elections.

== Members for Macedon ==
| Member | Party | Term |
|---|---|---|
| Joanne Duncan | Labor | 2002–2014 |
| Mary-Anne Thomas | Labor | 2014–present |

== Election results ==
=== Elections in the 2020s ===
2022 Victorian state election: Macedon
| Party | Candidate | Votes | % | ±% |
|---|---|---|---|---|
| Labor | Mary-Anne Thomas | 17,234 | 41.4 | −6.6 |
| Liberal | Dominic Bonanno | 12,463 | 30.0 | −1.9 |
| Greens | Marley McRae McLeod | 5,214 | 12.5 | +2.6 |
| Independent | Huntly Barton | 2,250 | 5.4 | +5.4 |
| One Nation | Amanda Evezard | 1,511 | 3.6 | +3.6 |
| Animal Justice | Iris Bergmann | 1,356 | 3.3 | −0.7 |
| Family First | Chris McCormack | 791 | 1.9 | +1.9 |
| Freedom | Kerryn P. Sedgman | 770 | 1.9 | +1.9 |
| Total formal votes | | 41,589 | 95.5 | +0.2 |
| Informal votes | | 1,974 | 4.5 | −0.2 |
| Turnout | | 43,563 | 90.7 | |
Two-party-preferred result
| Labor | Mary-Anne Thomas | 24,762 | 59.5 | −3.8 |
| Liberal | Dominic Bonanno | 16,827 | 40.5 | +3.8 |
| Labor hold | | Swing | −3.8 | |

=== Elections in the 2010s ===
2018 Victorian state election: Macedon
| Party | Candidate | Votes | % | ±% |
|---|---|---|---|---|
| Labor | Mary-Anne Thomas | 19,251 | 47.97 | +9.30 |
| Liberal | Amanda Millar | 12,836 | 31.98 | −11.16 |
| Greens | Ralf Thesing | 3,936 | 9.81 | −5.58 |
| Animal Justice | Ruth Parramore | 1,584 | 3.95 | +3.95 |
| Democratic Labour | Tony O'Brien | 1,296 | 3.23 | +3.23 |
| Independent | Rob Bakes | 1,230 | 3.06 | +3.06 |
| Total formal votes | | 40,133 | 95.27 | −1.06 |
| Informal votes | | 1,992 | 4.73 | +1.06 |
| Turnout | | 42,125 | 92.60 | −2.16 |
Two-party-preferred result
| Labor | Mary-Anne Thomas | 25,384 | 63.18 | +9.40 |
| Liberal | Amanda Millar | 14,794 | 36.82 | −9.40 |
| Labor hold | | Swing | +9.40 | |

2014 Victorian state election: Macedon
| Party | Candidate | Votes | % | ±% |
|---|---|---|---|---|
| Liberal | Donna Petrovich | 16,376 | 43.1 | +0.5 |
| Labor | Mary-Anne Thomas | 14,677 | 38.7 | −0.4 |
| Greens | Neil Barker | 5,841 | 15.4 | +2.2 |
| Family First | Peter Harland | 1,061 | 2.8 | +0.9 |
| Total formal votes | | 37,955 | 96.3 | +0.9 |
| Informal votes | | 1,445 | 3.7 | −0.9 |
| Turnout | | 39,400 | 94.8 | +5.7 |
Two-party-preferred result
| Labor | Mary-Anne Thomas | 20,417 | 53.8 | +1.4 |
| Liberal | Donna Petrovich | 17,538 | 46.2 | −1.4 |
| Labor hold | | Swing | +1.4 | |

2010 Victorian state election: Macedon
| Party | Candidate | Votes | % | ±% |
|---|---|---|---|---|
| Liberal | Tristan Weston | 18,141 | 42.32 | +11.01 |
| Labor | Joanne Duncan | 17,282 | 40.31 | −5.06 |
| Greens | Nicky Haslinghouse | 3,613 | 8.43 | +0.37 |
| Family First | Judith Hungerford | 1,049 | 2.45 | −0.15 |
| Independent | Mahinda Samararatna | 886 | 2.07 | +2.07 |
| Democratic Labor | Sharon Lane | 700 | 1.63 | +1.63 |
| Country Alliance | Gavin Greaves | 683 | 1.59 | +1.59 |
| Independent | Lorraine Beyer | 516 | 1.20 | +1.20 |
| Total formal votes | | 42,870 | 94.81 | −1.40 |
| Informal votes | | 2,349 | 5.19 | +1.40 |
| Turnout | | 45,219 | 94.51 | −0.27 |
Two-party-preferred result
| Labor | Joanne Duncan | 22,061 | 51.27 | −6.90 |
| Liberal | Tristan Weston | 20,970 | 48.73 | +6.90 |
| Labor hold | | Swing | −6.90 | |

=== Elections in the 2000s ===
2006 Victorian state election: Macedon
| Party | Candidate | Votes | % | ±% |
|---|---|---|---|---|
| Labor | Joanne Duncan | 17,667 | 45.4 | −7.2 |
| Liberal | Robyne Head | 12,190 | 31.3 | −4.3 |
| Greens | Leigh Johnson | 3,139 | 8.1 | −2.4 |
| Independent | Steve Medcraft | 2,623 | 6.7 | +6.7 |
| Independent | Dave Barry | 1,651 | 4.2 | +4.2 |
| Family First | Frank O'Connor | 1,014 | 2.6 | +2.6 |
| People Power | Rob Guthrie | 655 | 1.7 | +1.7 |
| Total formal votes | | 38,939 | 96.2 | −1.4 |
| Informal votes | | 1,534 | 3.8 | +1.4 |
| Turnout | | 40,473 | 94.8 | |
Two-party-preferred result
| Labor | Joanne Duncan | 22,649 | 58.2 | −1.0 |
| Liberal | Robyne Head | 16,290 | 41.8 | +1.0 |
| Labor hold | | Swing | −1.0 | |

2002 Victorian state election: Macedon
| Party | Candidate | Votes | % | ±% |
|---|---|---|---|---|
| Labor | Joanne Duncan | 19,119 | 52.6 | +11.5 |
| Liberal | Bernie Finn | 12,944 | 35.6 | −8.9 |
| Greens | Marcus Ward | 3,830 | 10.5 | +7.8 |
| Citizens Electoral Council | Bradley Scott | 426 | 1.2 | +1.2 |
| Total formal votes | | 36,319 | 97.6 | +0.0 |
| Informal votes | | 904 | 2.4 | −0.0 |
| Turnout | | 37,223 | 95.1 | |
Two-party-preferred result
| Labor | Joanne Duncan | 21,513 | 59.2 | +9.6 |
| Liberal | Bernie Finn | 14,798 | 40.8 | −9.6 |
| Labor gain from Liberal | | Swing | +9.6 | |
