= Electoral results for the district of Eureka =

Victoria, Australia, district election results

This is a list of electoral results for the district of Eureka in Victorian state elections.

== Members for Eureka ==
Member	Party	Term
Michaela Settle	Labor	2022–present

== Election results ==
=== Elections in the 2020s ===
2022 Victorian state election: Eureka
Party	Candidate	Votes	%	±%
Labor	Michaela Settle	18,531	41.0	−3.6
Liberal	Paul Tatchell	14,320	31.6	+0.7
Greens	Sam McColl	4,887	10.8	+1.7
Democratic Labour	Tabitha Rickard	1,821	4.0	+3.4
Animal Justice	Wendy Morrison	1,519	3.4	−0.5
Family First	Adrian Garcia	1,233	2.7	+2.7
Independent	Nicola Reid	1,083	2.4	+2.4
Freedom	Anthony Joseph Giampaolo	967	2.1	+2.1
Independent	Michael Ray	666	1.5	+1.5
Independent	Mark William Banwell	220	0.5	+0.5
Total formal votes		45,247	93.2	+1.0
Informal votes		3,297	6.8	−1.0
Turnout		48,544	89.1	−18
Two-party-preferred result
Labor	Michaela Settle	25,869	57.2	−2.4
Liberal	Paul Tatchell	19,378	42.8	+2.4
Labor hold		Swing	−2.4	
