= Jack Jones (Australian politician) =

Australian politician

John Joseph Jones (10 March 1907 – 22 March 1997) was an Australian politician.

He was born in Seymour to carpenter Charles Alexander Jones and Sarah Anne Bryant. He attended the local primary school and became a telegraph messenger and telephone technician. In 1928 he joined the Labor Party, and in 1934 was a founding member of the Nhill branch; he also served as secretary of the Stawell branch for 23 years. On 5 May 1936 he married Alice Edna Paschke, with whom he had a daughter. During World War II he was a signalman. On 21 June 1952 he was elected to the Victorian Legislative Council for Ballarat Province. He served until his defeat in 1958 and did not return to parliament, although he ran unsuccessfully for both upper and lower house seats in 1961, 1964, 1967 and 1970. Jones died on 22 March 1997.

Victorian Legislative Council
Preceded by James Kittson	Member for Ballarat; 1952–1958; Served alongside: Herbert Ludbrook; Pat Dickie	Succeeded by Murray Byrne
