= Julian Doyle =

Julian Doyle may refer to:

- Julian Doyle (politician)
- Julian Doyle (filmmaker)
