= Electoral district of Buninyong =

State electoral district of Victoria, Australia

Coordinates: 37.72°S 144°E

Buninyong Victoria—Legislative Assembly
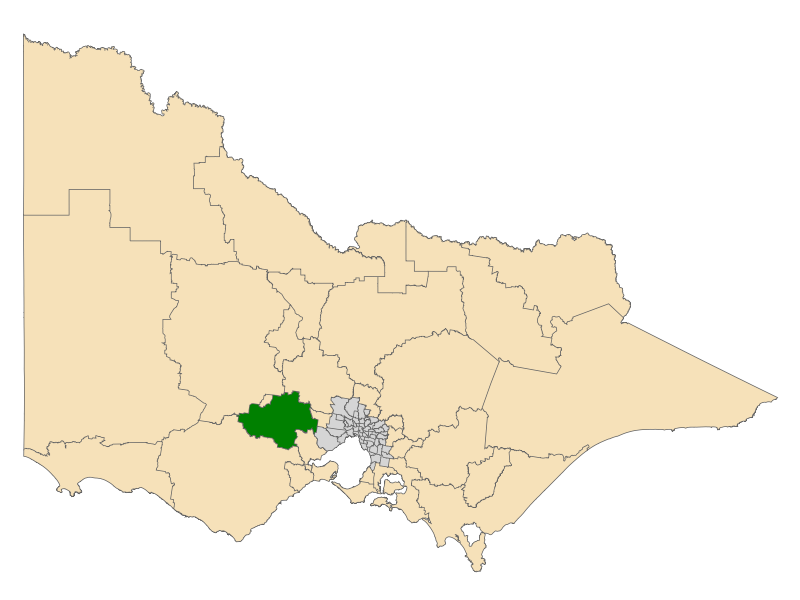
- Location of Buninyong (dark green) in Victoria
- State: Victoria
- Created: 2014
- Abolished: 2022
- MP: Michaela Settle
- Party: Australian Labor Party
- Electors: 45,559 (2018)
- Area: 3,107 km^{2} (1,199.6 sq mi)
- Demographic: Regional city

The electoral district of Buninyong was an electoral district of the Victorian Legislative Assembly in Australia. It was created in the redistribution of electoral boundaries in 2013, and came into effect at the 2014 state election.

It largely covered the area of the abolished district of Ballarat East, covering south and southeast suburbs of Ballarat as well as the rural areas to the south and east of the city. It included the suburbs of Eureka, Canadian, Sebastopol, Mount Clear, Buninyong and Golden Point. It also included the rural towns between Linton, Corindhap, Lethbridge, Ballan and Bungaree.

Buninyong was first contested at the 2014 election, and was won by the incumbent Labor MP for abolished Ballarat East, Geoff Howard.

The seat was abolished by the Electoral Boundaries Commission ahead of the 2022 election and largely replaced by the electoral district of Eureka.

== Members ==
Member	Party	Term
Geoff Howard	Labor	2014–2018
Michaela Settle	Labor	2018–2022

== Election results ==
2018 Victorian state election: Buninyong
Party	Candidate	Votes	%	±%
Labor	Michaela Settle	18,965	49.14	+5.59
Liberal	Andrew Kilmartin	11,921	30.89	−4.07
Greens	Linda Zibell	3,542	9.18	−1.77
Animal Justice	Wendy Morrison	1,581	4.10	+4.10
Independent	Dianne Colbert	1,285	3.33	+3.33
Independent	Brendan Eckel	467	1.21	+1.21
Independent	Lindsay Watters	436	1.13	+1.13
Victorian Socialists	Jane McKendrick	397	1.03	+1.03
Total formal votes		38,594	92.43	−2.76
Informal votes		3,160	7.57	+2.76
Turnout		41,754	91.65	−2.64
Two-party-preferred result
Labor	Michaela Settle	24,108	62.24	+5.88
Liberal	Andrew Kilmartin	14,627	37.76	−5.88
Labor hold		Swing	+5.88	

Two-party-preferred vote results in Ballarat East and Buninyong since 1992 View source data.
