= Pat Dickie =

Australian politician

Vance Oakley "Pat" Dickie (29 August 1918 – 16 May 2012) was an Australian politician of the state of Victoria, who held the Victorian Legislative Council seat of the Province of Ballarat from 1956 to 1978.

== Biography ==
Dickie was born in Bacchus Marsh, Victoria on 29 August 1918, the youngest son of Charles Dickie and Daphne Annabelle Vance. His education was initially in the Bacchus Marsh State and High Schools, and boarding to matriculation at Melbourne Grammar School. Upon entering a professional career he was a manager for Lifeguard Milk Products Pty Ltd, Bacchus Marsh (1937–1940 and 1949–1960) and a director from 1960 to 1966. This professional career was interrupted by his enlisting in the Australian Imperial Force for World War 2 in 1940, where he served in the 2/2 Heavy AA Regiment, 2/5 Battery in the Middle East, Java, and Darwin, achieving the rank of sergeant before delisting in 1944.

Community participation in the years following the war saw him hold roles as Bacchus Marsh shire councillor 1948–1964, president of council 1948–1949, 1960–1961; president Bacchus Marsh State School committee 1951–1964, Bacchus Marsh High School Council 1957–1964, Bacchus Marsh RSL 1954–1956, Bacchus Marsh War Memorial Hospital 1956–1964; member Bacchus Marsh Water Trust and Sewerage Authority 1958–1964; trustee Caulfield, Bacchus Marsh and Dowling Forest Racecourses and member Victoria Racing Club, Victoria Amateur Turf Club, Moonee Valley Racing Club.

Dickie entered government in following a by-election for the Legislative Council seat of Ballarat Province in March 1956, where he ran as a candidate for the Liberal Party, a seat which he continued to hold until his resignation from parliament in August 1978.

During his time in the Bolte and Hamer governments, Dickie served as the Minister of State Development (July 1964 – Dec 1965 and June 1970 – Aug 1972), Minister of Health (September 1965 – June 1970), Minister for Tourism (June 1970 – Aug 1972), Minister of Immigration (December 1970 – Aug 1972), Minister of Housing (August 1972 – March 1976), Minister for Aboriginal Affairs (August 1972 – January 1975), and Chief Secretary (March 1976 – August 1978). He also served on the following committees of the Parliament of Victoria — Population Distribution committee 1961–1963 (chairman) and the Statute Law Revision committee 1958–1961. Within the party structure he was Secretary to cabinet 1964, deputy government Legislative Council leader 1972–1976, and government Legislative Council leader 1976–1978.

== Personal ==
Dickie married Dorothy Jean Malcolm on 22 January 1944 and had three children. He died on 16 May 2012 in Bacchus Marsh.

Victorian Legislative Council
Preceded by Herbert Ludbrook	Member for Ballarat Province; 1956–1978	Succeeded by David Williams
Political offices
Preceded by Henry Bolte	Minister of State Development; 1964–1965	Succeeded by Jim Manson
Preceded by Sir Arthur Rylah	Minister of Health; 1965–1970	Succeeded by John Rossiter
Preceded by Jim Manson	Minister of State Development; 1970–1972	Succeeded by Murray Byrne
Preceded by Jim Manson	Minister for Tourism; 1970–1972	Succeeded by Murray Byrne
Preceded by George Reid	Minister of Immigration; 1970–1972	Succeeded by Murray Byrne
Preceded by Edward Meagher	Minister of Housing; 1972–1976	Succeeded by Geoff Hayes
Preceded by Edward Meagher	Minister for Aboriginal Affairs; 1972–1975	Ministry abolished
Preceded by John Rossiter	Chief Secretary of Victoria; 1976–1978	Succeeded by Joe Rafferty
