= Theophilus Williams =

Welsh-Australian businessman

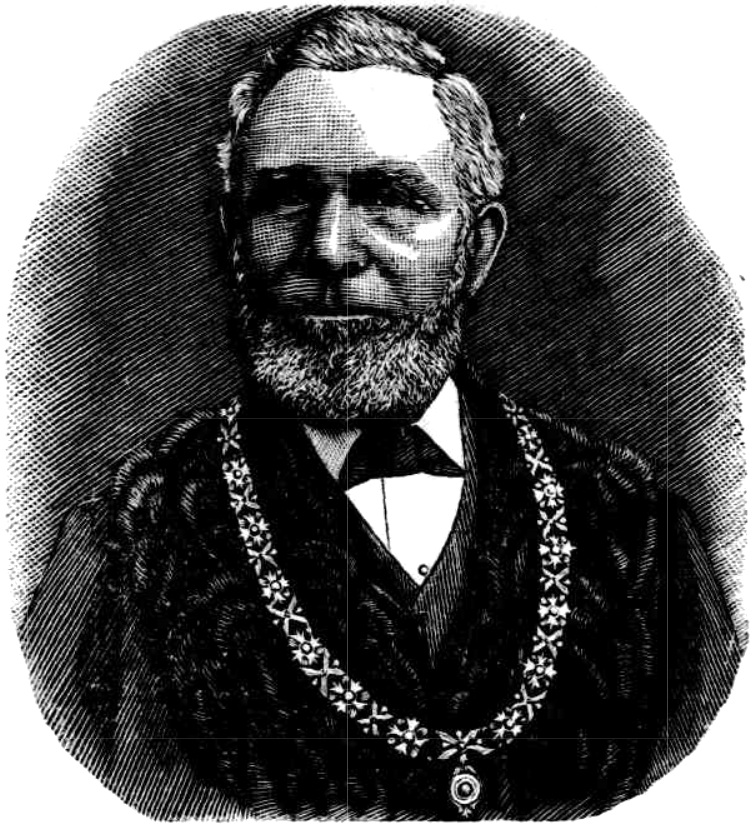
- Theophilus Williams J.P.
- Born: 7 August 1824; Bristol, England
- Died: 26 June 1904 (aged 79)
- Other names: Theos Williams
- Education: School of Three Crosses
- Occupation: businessman
- Known for: mayor of Ballarat East
- Spouse: Elizabeth Williams
- Children: 1 son, 1 daughter

Theophilus Williams (Note: "Theophilus" is often abbreviated as "Theos") (7 August 1824 – 26 June 1904) was an Australian businessman of Welsh origin who served as mayor of Ballarat East for three separate terms.

== History ==
Williams was born in Bristol, England, but grew up in Loughor, in the west of Glamorganshire. He received some formal education at the School of Three Crosses before being sent to work at John Guest's iron works at Dowlais, near Merthyr Tydvil. While at the school attached to the factory his dexterity and mental agility were noticed by Lady Guest, who recommended him to Sir Charles Barry, who put him to work on ornamental work on the new Palace of Westminster.

When news of the great Australian gold discoveries reached London, he joined the rush, and arrived in Ballarat in September 1853, and immediately set to work, with some success, and was on the goldfields at the time of the Eureka Stockade and helped treat the injuries of some of the wounded. When the Local Court was established he was elected to the board set up to resolve disputes. He purchased a large claim at Moorabool, a significant source of slate, which he leased to a mining company. In 1865 he was appointed manager of the Great Redan Extended Company, and in 1872 made manager of the Llanberris company.

In August 1876 he was elected to the Ballarat East council, a post he retained for many years. He was elected mayor for the terms 1881–82, 1887–88, and 1894–95.

He served as the council representative on the Ballarat Water Commission for nine years, was a founder and committee member of the Mechanics' Institute, a founder of the original Ballarat Eisteddfod and its secretary for the 1880 competitions. He was one of the original trustees, and a staunch adherent, of the Welsh Church in Armstrong Street, and a moderator of the Welsh Calvinistic Methodist Association of Victoria 1888–89.

In 1887 he was a founder of the Cambrian Society in Ballarat as a Welsh social, cultural and charitable organisation. It only survived a few years however; its name was revived in 1906 with the energetic Sebastopol Cambrian Society.

He retired from the council in August 1900.

Williams married Elizabeth (died 22 January 1908); they had a home, "Llanberris House", Dowling Street, Ballarat North. Their family included:

- eldest son Taliesin Williams (c. 1862 – 17 February 1901)
- eldest daughter Rachel Maud Williams married John Anthony Atkinson on 26 April 1893

No further details have been found.
