= Ballarat Orphanage =

Former orphanage in Victoria, Australia

Ballarat Orphanage, originally called the Ballarat District Orphan Asylum, was a boys' and girls' orphanage located in Ballarat, Victoria. The orphanage was the focal point in a 2002 lawsuit brought on by 14 former wards who alleged that abuse occurred at the orphanage in the 1960s.

== History ==
The Ballarat District Orphan Asylum was founded in 1865. It was run by an officially non-denominational board, though the members of the board were nominally Protestant. In 1909, the name was changed to Ballarat Orphanage.

The first superintendent and matron of Ballarat District Orphan Asylum were local public school teachers named Mr. and Mrs. Finlay. Other notable superintendents included Arthur Kenny, who served from 1884 to 1925 and oversaw the orphanage's name change, and politician Herbert Ludbrook.

In 1968, Ballarat Orphanage was officially dissolved, reorganizing as Ballarat Children's Home. In 1988, Ballarat Children's Homes and Family Services sold the orphanage and the building was converted into a Catholic technical school.

== Notable controversies ==
In 2002, 14 former state wards filed a lawsuit against the government of the state of Victoria alleging a "systematic campaign of cruelty, physical beatings, and sexual abuse at the hands of some Ballarat Orphanage staff members, particularly in 1963 and 1964". Charges filed against the then-88 year old former superintendent of Ballarat Orphanage, Hylton David Sedgman, were withdrawn by the Director of Public Prosecutions due to his age.

In 2021, credible allegations of abuse against Sedgman, who acted as superintendent in 1964, were uncovered by Charlotte King while working on a report for the Australian Broadcasting Commission's investigative program Background Briefing. The report documented a child abuse cover-up which implicated the then-Solicitor-General Sir Henry Winneke, senior public servant John Dillon, Attorney-General Sir Arthur Rylah, the President of the Ballarat Orphanage board, and the Board of Directors, which King described as an "all-male board that included civic leaders, a former state MP, and the mayor of Ballarat".

=== Stolen Generations ===
From 1887, Aboriginal children as part of the ‘stolen generation’ entered the orphanage. Unlike domestic home life, the large scale and order of the orphanage was reflected in the regimented routine of daily life. Children were subject to constant surveillance with restrictions on food, play, clothing and daily routine. This emotional and physically punitive institutional regime – which was considered appropriate and not confined to the Ballarat Orphanage at the time – continued until the end of the 1950s.

Ballarat Orphanage housed members of the Stolen Generations. In the report Bringing Them Home, Barwick stated that "during 1956 and 1957, more than one hundred and fifty children (more than 10 per cent of the children in the Aboriginal population of Victoria at the time) were living in State children's institutions." The report states that many Aboriginal children were taken to Ballarat Orphanage. Over decades, thousands of stolen children ranging in ages from infancy to sixteen years old were housed in five orphanages: Ballarat Orphanage, St. Joseph's Home, Alexandra Babies Home, Nazareth House, and Warrawee Reception Centre. There are documented reports of physical, emotional, and sexual abuse taking place at all five centres. A third of stolen children lost all contact with their families.

The Stolen Generations' Testimonies Foundation has documented the stories of Aboriginal children housed at Ballarat Orphanage, such as Kennedy Edwards Uncle Murray Harrison, and Peter Clarke. A Buzzfeed article profiling the descendants of the Stolen Generations reported that "two generations of Nicole Cassar's family, her grandmother and her mother, were forcibly removed from their Aboriginal families and placed, in different eras, in the notorious Ballarat Orphanage which later became the Ballarat Children's Home. It was opened in 1909 and closed in 1987. The home has since become synonymous with unimaginable abuse and cruelty and the deaths of least 25 children".

In 2000, the Heritages Services Program was established to support past residents of the orphanage and children's homes.
