= William Little (Australian poet) =

Australian politician and poet

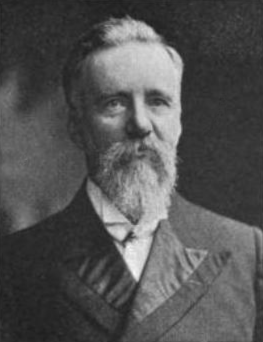
- Born: 7 February 1839; Cumberland, Cumbria, England
- Died: 2 October 1916 (aged 77); Ballarat, Victoria, Australia
- Occupations: Politician, poet
- Spouse: Catherine Walford Cazaly

William Little (1839–1916) was an Australian politician and poet.

== Biography ==
=== Early life ===
William Little was born on 7 February 1839 in Cumberland, Cumbria, England. He emigrated to Australia with his family in 1851, arriving at Corio Bay when he was twelve years old. Two years later, at the age of fourteen, he got his first job as a messenger in the Geelong Customs House in Geelong and later worked as a clerk for Mr James Oddie. He graduated from the University of Melbourne.

=== Career ===
From 1880 onwards, he worked as an auctioneer, a real estate agent, and an insurance and finance agent in Ballarat. Additionally, he served as a Justice of the Peace. He then served as a City Councillor from 1883 to 1892 and as Mayor of Ballarat from 1889 to 1891. As Mayor, on Arbour Day 1890, he added 1,250 trees to Victoria Park. He also served as a lay preacher in the Wesleyan Church, and he was a Freemason.

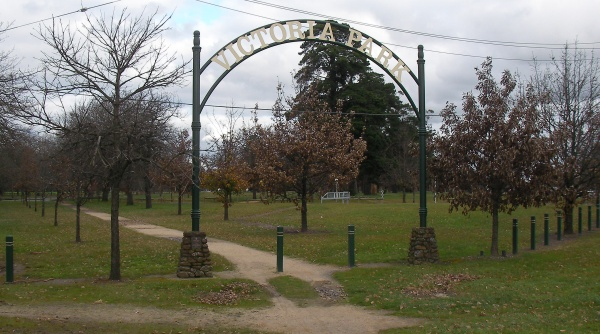
Victoria Park in Ballarat

He became a prolific poet, writing under the pen-name of 'Lambda'. He also published short stories, an essay, historical articles and guidebooks.

=== Personal life ===
He married Catherine Walford Cazaly.

=== Death ===
He died on 2 October 1916 in Ballarat.

== See also ==
- List of mayors of Ballarat
