= Herbert Ludbrook =

Australian politician

Herbert Charles Ludbrook (8 November 1888 – 15 January 1956) was an Australian politician.

He was born in Ballarat East to builder George Henry Ludbrook and Mary Ann Lowe. He was a painter, and in 1906 joined the 9th Light Horse. During World War I he served with the 6th Field Ambulance in Gallipoli and in France, where he was badly wounded. In 1918 he married Daisie Mary Llewellyn in London, England; they had two daughters. In 1925 he became superintendent of Ballarat Orphanage. He was elected to the Victorian Legislative Council as a Liberal and Country Party member for Ballarat Province in 1949. Ludbrook died in Ballarat in 1956.

Victorian Legislative Council
Preceded by Alfred Pittard	Member for Ballarat; 1949–1956; Served alongside: James Kittson; Jack Jones	Succeeded by Pat Dickie
