= James Kittson =

Australian politician

Member of the Victorian Legislative Council for Ballarat
- In office 15 June 1946 – 20 June 1952 Serving with Alfred Pittard and Herbert Ludbrook
- Preceded by: George Bolster
- Succeeded by: Jack Jones

Personal details
- Born: 26 November 1891 Greenwald, Victoria
- Died: 17 October 1971 (aged 79) Ballarat, Victoria
- Party: Liberal Party

Military service
- Allegiance: Australia
- Branch/service: Australian Imperial Force
- Years of service: 1914–1919
- Rank: Lieutenant
- Unit: 8th Battalion
- Battles/wars: First World War
- Awards: Military Medal

James Frederick Kittson MM (26 November 1891 – 17 October 1971) was an Australian politician.

He was born in Greenwald to farmer John Frederick Kittson and Marion Remfry. He attended state school at Heywood and worked briefly at the Boolarra Butter Factory before serving in the 8th Battalion during the First World War. He was awarded the Military Medal. On 21 August 1915 he married Minnie Birch, with whom he had one son.

After the war, he became secretary of the Cobden Butter Factory, and from 1919 business manager for the Wallace Millbrook and Buninyong Butter Company. He became director of the butter company in 1942. In 1946 he was elected to the Victorian Legislative Council for Ballarat Province, representing the Liberal Party. He was defeated in 1952. Kittson retained the directorship of his company until his retirement in 1970, and died at Ballarat in 1971.

Victorian Legislative Council
Preceded by George Bolster	Member for Ballarat; 1946–1952; Served alongside: Alfred Pittard; Herbert Ludbrook	Succeeded by Jack Jones
