= Julian Doyle (politician) =

Australian lawyer, politician and civil servant

- Born: 26 July 1935
- Died: 16 September 2007 (aged 72)

Julian John Doyle (26 July 1935 – 16 September 2007) was an Australian lawyer, politician and civil servant. He served as a member of the Victorian Legislative Assembly for the seat of Gisborne from 1967 to 1971.

== Early life ==
Doyle was born in East Melbourne, Victoria, the son of Victor and Phyllis Doyle. Doyle went to school at Xavier College in Melbourne, and graduated in law at the University of Melbourne.

== Politics ==
Doyle joined the Liberal Party in 1958, and became president of the South Yarra Branch. He was a Councillor for the City of Prahran from 1965 to 1967 and was a member of the Victorian Legislative Assembly from 1967 to 1971, representing the seat of Gisborne.

Doyle resigned in September 1971, frustrated by the constraints put on him by his leader Henry Bolte. Chief amongst these was Bolte's refusal to release the Victorian Liberal Party Poverty Report, based on an inquiry Doyle chaired, and which was described in January 1971 as having been 'firmly suppressed by Sir Henry since the day it was presented to him in 1969.' The relationship between Doyle and Bolte became even more strained when Prime Minister John Gorton asked to see a copy of the suppressed report. It was said at the time that 'In Victorian State Liberal circles, people who praise John Gorton and embarrass Sir Henry Bolte have a limited political future.'

Tom Reynolds, Doyle's successor in the seat of Gisborne, described the challenge of following in the footsteps of Doyle, in that he was an "illustrious man" with the "obvious talents" of "height, good looks, a law degree, [and] being able to sing or to play the bass fiddle".

== Legal career ==
Doyle started his legal career with Arthur Robinson and Co, Melbourne, (predecessor of Allens Arthur Robinson), from 1958 to 1962. Between 1965 and 1971 he was a sole practitioner in Toorak, and then became a partner with Ellison, Hewison and Whitehead, solicitors, (a predecessor of Minter Ellison) in Melbourne, during 1976 and 1977. Between 1989 and 1996 he was a partner of Goulden's Solicitors London, predecessor of Jones Day Goulden, based in Brussels.

== Civil Service ==
Doyle served in a variety of Government positions in Australia and overseas. He was trade Commissioner in London, 1972–1973; Commercial Counsellor for Australian mission to the EEC, Brussels, 1973–1975; Senior Trade Commissioner, Nairobi, 1975–1976; Australian Delegate to the United Nations Commission for Trade and Development 1976; Chairman of the Victorian Immigration Advisory Council 1977–1978; [ICOSI See below], 1979–1980; Director Victorian Promotion Committee 1980–1981; General manager Victorian Economic Development Corporation 1981–1983; Delegate Organisation for Economic Co-operation and Development Technology Conference, Paris 1983; and Legal Adviser to Minister of Justice, General Counsel to Central Bank of Eritrea 1998–99.

== Tobacco Industry ==
1979–1980; During this year he was Secretary-General of the tobacco industry's International Committee on Smoking Issues (ICOSI) in Brussels with a budget of a million US dollars. This organisation was the cigarette companies first joint main lobbyists and representatives. It had been created in June 1977 at a secret top-level meeting at Shockerwick House (UK) of the main industry executive lobbyists under the code name "Operation Berkshire".

The concept of a fulltime EEC lobby was constructed on an older "Social Acceptability Working Party" (SAWP) of international staff of the companies who were trying to block the activities of anti-smoking organisations. Julian Doyle was chosen by a group of Australian executives who ran the strategy operations for Philip Morris International out of Switzerland and the New York.

Doyle was dismissed in 1980 and replaced by Bryan Simpson who had run the Tobacco Institute of Australia, and had been newspaper editor, advertising manager and organiser of the Media Council of Australia on behalf of Rupert Murdoch's newspaper group, and the tobacco industry in its various attempts to retain cigarette advertising and brand-name sports sponsorship.

== Family ==
Doyle married three times and had five children. He married Ann Clementson in 1964, Kate Baillieu in 1983, and Sally Anne Roberts in 1989. He died in Melbourne in 2007.
