= Michaela Settle =

Australian politician

The Honourable Michaela Settle MP
- Settle in 2026

Minister for Rural and Regional Development
- Incumbent
- Assumed office 4 August 2026
- Premier: Ben Carroll
- Preceded by: Herself (as Minister for Regional Development)

Minister for Agriculture
- Incumbent
- Assumed office 15 April 2026
- Premier: Jacinta Allan; Ben Carroll
- Preceded by: Ros Spence

Minister for Water
- Incumbent
- Assumed office 4 August 2026
- Premier: Ben Carroll
- Preceded by: Harriet Shing
Other ministerial offices
Minister for Regional Development
In office 15 April 2026 – 4 August 2026
Premier	Jacinta Allan
Preceded by	Jaclyn Symes
Succeeded by	Herself (as Minister for Rural and Regional Development)

Member of the Victorian Legislative Assembly for Eureka
- Incumbent
- Assumed office 26 November 2022
- Preceded by: New seat

Member of the Victorian Legislative Assembly for Buninyong
- In office 24 November 2018 – 26 November 2022
- Preceded by: Geoff Howard
- Succeeded by: Seat abolished

Personal details
- Born: 20 August 1964 (age 62) Melbourne, Australia
- Party: Labor Party
- Website: www.michaelasettle.com.au

Michaela Settle (born 20 August 1964) is an Australian politician. She has been a Labor Party member of the Victorian Legislative Assembly since November 2018, representing the seats of Buninyong and Eureka.

== Early life ==
Settle was born in 1964 in Melbourne and grew up Canberra and in regional Victoria in Castlemaine. After leaving school, she worked in the public relations sector before taking over the running of the family farm. She attended TAFE and Federation University, where she studied Professional Writing and Editing, before becoming marketing manager for Ballarat Community Health.

== Political career ==
In 2017, Settle was pre-selected to replace the retiring member for Buninyong, Geoff Howard. At the 2018 Victorian state election, which saw a substantial swing to Labor across the state, she was elected with an increased margin, gaining 49.1% of first-preference votes. Her inaugural speech in the Legislative Assembly was on 20 February 2019.

Ahead of the 2022 Victorian state election, the seat of Buninyong was renamed Eureka following a significant shift in boundaries. Settle successfully re-contested the election.

== Personal life ==
Settle lives in Ballarat and has two adult children.

Parliament of Victoria
Preceded by Geoff Howard	Member for Buninyong; 2018–2022	District abolished
District created	Member for Eureka; 2022–present	Incumbent
