= Tom Reynolds (Australian politician) =

Australian politician (1936–2022)

Thomas Carter Reynolds (19 December 1936 – 26 March 2022) was an Australian politician.

He was born in Moe to farmer Jack Carter Reynolds and Edna Elizabeth, née McCabe, the latter a relative of state MP James McCabe. He was educated at Bolinda State School, Kyneton High School and the Royal Melbourne Institute of Technology. He was a farmer from 1953 to 1957, when he became a trainee executive with G. J. Coles. In 1959 he became a shearer and in 1967 a hardware merchant at Romsey. On 5 August 1961 he married Helen Agnes Birrell; they had two sons. In 1979 he was elected to the Victorian Legislative Assembly as the Liberal member for Gisborne. He was promoted to the front bench in 1982 as Shadow Minister for Sport, Recreation and Racing; he stepped down in 1988 but returned to the position in 1991, moving to the ministerial office in 1992. In 1996 he became Minister for Rural Development in addition to his sport responsibilities. He retired from politics at the 1999 state election. Reynolds died on 26 March 2022, at the age of 85.

Victorian Legislative Assembly
Preceded by Athol Guy	Member for Gisborne; 1979–1999	Succeeded by Joanne Duncan
