= George Bolster =

Australian politician (1877–1948)

George Bolster (9 September 1877 – 26 October 1948) was an Australian politician.

He was born in Haddon to coach proprietor Richard Bolster and Ellen Ross. He attended state school and went to Western Australia in around 1900 with his brother to follow his father's trade. He returned to Victoria around 1902 and took over his mother's Ballarat grocery. On 7 June 1909 he married Eliza Jane Dimsey, with whom he had four sons. He expanded his business to include a number of stores around Ballarat, and also served on Ballarat City Council from 1925 to 1934, with a period as mayor from 1929 to 1930. In 1934 he was elected to the Victorian Legislative Council for Wellington Province, representing the United Australia Party. He switched to Ballarat Province in 1940 and retired in 1946. Bolster died at Ballarat East in 1948.

Victorian Legislative Council
Preceded by Frederick Brawn	Member for Wellington Province; 1934–1940; Served alongside: Alfred Pittard	Abolished
New seat	Member for Ballarat; 1940–1946; Served alongside: Alfred Pittard	Succeeded by James Kittson
