= Barry Traynor =

Australian politician

Barry Edward Traynor is an Australian former politician and police officer.

He joined the Liberal Party in 1988 as a member of the Wendouree branch, and in 1992 was elected to the Victorian Legislative Assembly as the member for Ballarat East. He served until his defeat in 1999, whereupon he returned to the police service.

Traynor was awarded the Medal of the Order of Australia in the 2025 King's Birthday Honours for "service to police welfare, and to the Parliament of Victoria".

Victorian Legislative Assembly
New seat	Member for Ballarat East; 1992–1999	Succeeded by Geoff Howard
