= Alfred Pittard =

Australian politician

Alfred James Pittard CBE (known as Jim Pittard) (3 August 1868 – 16 May 1950) was an Australian politician.

He was born in Ballarat West to bootmaker James Alfred Pittard and Annie née Drew, both English born. He followed his father into the shoemaking business, and eventually took over the family firm. He served on Ballarat East Town Council from 1901 to 1919 (mayor 1913–14, 1920–21) and Ballarat City Council from 1919 to 1927 (mayor 1926–27). On 6 March 1895 he had married Alice Mary Crocker, with whom he had two children; one of them, Alan, would later serve a term in the Australian House of Representatives.

In 1931 he was elected to the Victorian Legislative Council for Wellington, moving to Ballarat Province in 1937. He was appointed Commander of the Order of the British Empire in 1946, and retired from politics in 1949. Pittard died in Ballarat in 1950.

Victorian Legislative Council
Preceded by Alexander Bell	Member for Wellington; 1931–1937; Served alongside: Frederick Brawn; George Bolster	Abolished
New seat	Member for Ballarat; 1937–1949; Served alongside: George Bolster; James Kittson	Succeeded by Herbert Ludbrook
