= Joanne Duncan (politician) =

Australian politician

Member of the Victorian Legislative Assembly for Gisborne
- In office 18 September 1999 – 30 November 2002
- Preceded by: Tom Reynolds
- Succeeded by: District abolished

Member of the Victorian Legislative Assembly for Macedon
- In office 30 November 2002 – 29 November 2014
- Preceded by: District created
- Succeeded by: Mary-Anne Thomas

Personal details
- Born: 1 May 1959 (age 67) Melbourne
- Party: Labor Party
- Education: Melbourne College of Advanced Education
- Website: joanneduncan.com.au

Joanne Therese Duncan (born 1 May 1959) is an Australian politician. She was a Labor Party member of the Victorian Legislative Assembly from 1999 to 2014, representing Macedon from 2002.

== Education ==
Duncan was born in Melbourne, Victoria and attended St Columba's in Essendon 1970–76. In 1977 she became an audio-visual tech. In 1988 she received a Bachelor of Education from Melbourne College of Advanced Education and became a teacher/librarian.

== Political career ==
In 1999, Duncan was preselected as the Labor candidate for the Liberal-held seat of Gisborne, held by retiring Liberal incumbent Tom Reynolds. Duncan defeated Liberal MLC Rob Knowles on a swing of nine percent. Her victory was part of an unexpected swing to Labor in country Victoria that allowed Steve Bracks to win government. The seat was abolished in 2002, and Duncan followed most of her constituents into Macedon, which she represented until her retirement in 2014.

Victorian Legislative Assembly
Preceded by Tom Reynolds	Member for Gisborne; 1999–2002	District abolished
District created	Member for Macedon; 2002–2014	Succeeded by Mary-Anne Thomas
