= David Williams (Australian politician) =

Australian politician

David George Williams (born 23 August 1941) is an Australian former politician. He was a member of the Victorian Legislative Council from 1978–1979.

Born at Benalla to schoolteacher Ralph Noel Williams and Rita Alice Hawkins, Williams attended school in Geelong before studying at the University of Melbourne, receiving a Bachelor of Commerce and a Bachelor of Education and then a Diploma of Business from the Royal Melbourne Institute of Technology. While at university he joined the Labor Party. On 22 August 1964, he married Jennifer Claire Dodd, with whom he had two sons. He worked as a lecturer at Ballarat College of Advanced Education, contesting the federal seat of Ballarat for the Labor Party in 1972, 1974, and 1975. In 1978, he won the state Legislative Council seat of Ballarat Province at a by-election, only to lose it in 1979 after a boundary change. Following his defeat, he became an accountant and treasurer for Richmond City Council, town clerk from 1982, and Chief Executive Officer from 1984 to 1994. Since then he has been a community engagement consultant.
