= Dick de Fegely =

Australian politician (1928–2012)

Richard Strachan de Fegely (15 October 1928 – 27 October 2012) was an Australian politician.

He was born in Ararat to Albert de Fegely, a farmer, and Laura de Nully. After attending Ararat High School and Geelong Grammar School, he worked as a farmer. In 1953 he married Ruth Beggs, with whom he had three sons. A member of the Liberal Party, he was delegate to the Wimmera Electorate Committee (1975–79), President of the Ararat Branch (1976–79), a member of the Wannon Finance Committee (1978–83), chairman of the Ripon Electorate Committee (1979–83), a delegate to the State Council (1979–83), and vice-chairman of the Wannon/Corangamite Area Conference (1982–83).

In 1985 de Fegely was elected to the Victorian Legislative Council as the Liberal member for Ballarat Province. He was Shadow Minister for Housing and Construction from 1988 to 1989 and the Liberal Whip in the Legislative Council from 1991 to 1996. From 1996 to 1999 he was the Liberal Party Secretary, and he served on numerous committees. He retired in 1999, and in 2001 was awarded the Centenary Medal. De Fegely died in 2012.
