= Glenyys Romanes =

Australian politician

Glenyys Dorothy Romanes AM (born 19 December 1945) is a former Australian politician.

Born in Melbourne, she attended public schools in Coburg before attending the University of Melbourne, where she received a Bachelor of Arts in 1967 and a Diploma of Education in 1968. She was a secondary school teacher in Shepparton until 1979, and was Joint Victorian State Director 1980–86 and Overseas Program Co-ordinator 1986–94. In 1991 she was elected to Brunswick City Council, serving as mayor from 1993 until the council was abolished by the Kennett government in 1994, as part of that government's local council amalgamation policy. Romanes was mayor of the newly formed Moreland City Council (now City of Merri-bek) from 1996–99.

In 1999, she was elected to the Victorian Legislative Council as the Labor member for Melbourne Province. Following the reform of the Legislative Council in 2006, she was given the third position on the Labor ticket for the Eastern Victoria Region, behind fellow MLCs Matt Viney and Johan Scheffer, and she failed to be re-elected at the subsequent 2006 Victorian state election.

After her departure from parliament she worked for the Victorian Department of Transport as Assistant Director Market Development in the Public Transport Division.

Romanes was appointed a Member of the Order of Australia for "significant service to the Parliament of Victoria, and to the community" in the 2021 Queen's Birthday Honours.
