= Murray Byrne =

Australian politician (1928–2012)

Murray Lewis Byrne CMG (29 August 1928 – 7 November 2012) was an Australian politician from the Liberal Party who served as a member of the Victorian Legislative Council for Ballarat Province from 21 June 1958 to 28 April 1976.

He served as Victoria's Minister for Public Works from June 1970 to August 1972, and as Minister for State Development and Decentralisation, Tourism and Immigration from August 1972 to March 1976.

Born in Ballarat, Victoria, Byrne died in Ballarat on 7 November 2012 at the age of 84. He and his wife Adele had eight children.
