= John McQuilten =

Australian politician

John Martin McQuilten (10 November 1949 – 2 January 2015) was an Australian politician.

Born in Sunshine, Victoria, he attended public schools at Aberfeldie and Essendon before becoming a vigneron and business consultant. He was an executive of the Victorian Soft Drink Association and vice-president of the Pyrenees Vignerons.

In 1999, McQuilten was elected to the Victorian Legislative Council as a Labor MLC for Ballarat Province. He served until 2006, when electoral reforms meant that he could not be found a seat.
