= Ballarat Province =

Former electoral province of the Victorian Legislative Council, Australia

Coordinates: 37°33′S 143°51′E

Ballarat Province Victoria—Legislative Council
- State: Victoria
- Created: 1937
- Abolished: 2006
- Namesake: Ballarat

Ballarat Province was an electorate of the Victorian Legislative Council from 1937 until 2006, located around Ballarat.

Ballarat, along with Doutta Galla, Higinbotham and Monash Provinces was created in the expansion of the Legislative Council in 1937. Ballarat was abolished from the 2006 state election in the wake of the Bracks Labor government's reform of the Legislative Council.

== Members ==
Members for Ballarat Province
Year	Member	Party	Member	Party
1937	Alfred Pittard	United Australia		
1940	Alfred Pittard	United Australia	George Bolster	United Australia
1943	Alfred Pittard	United Australia	George Bolster	United Australia
1945	Alfred Pittard	Liberal	George Bolster	Liberal
1946	Alfred Pittard	Liberal	James Kittson	Liberal
1949	Alfred Pittard	Liberal and Country	James Kittson	Liberal and Country
1949	Herbert Ludbrook	Liberal and Country	James Kittson	Liberal and Country
1952	Herbert Ludbrook	Liberal and Country	Jack Jones	Labor
1955	Herbert Ludbrook	Liberal and Country	Jack Jones	Labor
1956	Pat Dickie	Liberal and Country	Jack Jones	Labor
1958	Pat Dickie	Liberal and Country	Murray Byrne	Liberal and Country
1961	Pat Dickie	Liberal and Country	Murray Byrne	Liberal and Country
1964	Pat Dickie	Liberal and Country	Murray Byrne	Liberal and Country
1965	Pat Dickie	Liberal	Murray Byrne	Liberal
1967	Pat Dickie	Liberal	Murray Byrne	Liberal
1970	Pat Dickie	Liberal	Murray Byrne	Liberal
1973	Pat Dickie	Liberal	Murray Byrne	Liberal
1976	Pat Dickie	Liberal	Rob Knowles	Liberal
1978	David Williams	Labor	Rob Knowles	Liberal
1979	Clive Bubb	Liberal	Rob Knowles	Liberal
1982	Clive Bubb	Liberal	Rob Knowles	Liberal
1985	Dick de Fegely	Liberal	Rob Knowles	Liberal
1988	Dick de Fegely	Liberal	Rob Knowles	Liberal
1992	Dick de Fegely	Liberal	Rob Knowles	Liberal
1996	Dick de Fegely	Liberal	Rob Knowles	Liberal
1999	Dianne Hadden	Labor	John McQuilten	Labor
2002	Dianne Hadden	Labor	John McQuilten	Labor

== Election results ==
2002 Victorian state election: Ballarat Province
Party	Candidate	Votes	%	±%
Labor	John McQuilten	72,519	52.5	+3.0
Liberal	Helen Bath	48,645	35.2	−10.5
Greens	Cherie Bridges	14,182	10.3	+10.3
Democrats	Geoff Lutz	2,809	2.0	−2.3
Total formal votes		138,155	97.0	0.0
Informal votes		4,317	3.0	0.0
Turnout		142,472	94.5	
Two-party-preferred result
Labor	John McQuilten	84,713	61.3	+9.0
Liberal	Helen Bath	53,426	38.7	−9.0
Labor hold		Swing	+9.0	
