= Dianne Hadden =

Australian politician (born 1951)

Dianne Gladys Hadden (born 4 October 1951) is an Australian politician. She was an independent member of the Victorian Legislative Council since April 2004, after resigning from the Labor Party, which she previously represented in the council for Ballarat Province since 1999. She attempted to switch to the Victorian Legislative Assembly at the 2006 election, contesting the electorate of Ballarat East, but gained less than 7% of the vote.

Hadden was born in Ivanhoe, Melbourne, and studied economics and law at Monash University. She worked for law firms in Melbourne and Ballarat, before founding her own practice in Ballarat in 1992.

In the leadup to the 1999 state election, Hadden succeeded in securing Labor pre-selection for the Liberal-held seat of Ballarat Province. She was ultimately successful, defeating new Liberal candidate, David Clark. Though she has never occupied a ministerial position, Hadden has been a member of the Law Reform Committee since her election to parliament, and in 2003, also joined the House Committee.

Hadden has gained a reputation as something of a political maverick, having publicly attacked her own party on several issues. She came out strongly against controversial plans to build a toxic waste dump at Pittong, near Ballarat, and tabling a petition opposing the proposal in parliament. When Premier Steve Bracks continued to push for the dump to be sited at Pittong, despite significant negative publicity, she publicly slammed the government, labelling them "arrogant and dogmatic", and comparing them to former Liberal Premier Jeff Kennett - though this earned a stern rebuke from Bracks. The campaign was ultimately successful, but it cemented her falling out with the party, resulting in her resignation to become an independent in April 2004. She attempted unsuccessfully to switch to the Victorian Legislative Assembly seat of Ballarat East at the 2006 election, but came fourth, gaining 6.61% of the vote and allowing long-time rival Geoff Howard to win easily.

Hadden has been a sharp critic of genetically modified crops and her government's policies on the issue, and has publicly pushed for a harder stance. She also attacked the 2003 invasion of Iraq, and was among ten Victorian Labor MPs who signed a petition declaring their opposition to the war. She is a member of a number of community organisations, including Amnesty International, the Fred Hollows Foundation and the National Trust of Australia.
