= Rob Knowles =

Australian politician

Robert Ian "Rob" Knowles (4 July 1947 - 29 April 2026) is a former Australian politician.

He was born in Ballarat to farmer Robert Joseph Knowles and Dulce, née Odgers. After graduating from Ballarat North Technical School, he became a farmer in Clarendon from 1964. From 1972 to 1976 he worked as a loans officer with the Rural Finance and Settlement Commission. He was a member of the Liberal Party, serving as chairman of the Ballarat Federal Electorate Council from 1972 to 1976, a state executive with the Young Liberals, and a member of the state executive from 1973 to 1976.

In 1976, Knowles was elected to the Victorian Legislative Council as a member for Ballarat Province. He served on various committees until his elevation to the front bench as Shadow Minister for the Aged and for Housing in 1991. When the Coalition won office in 1992 he became Minister for Housing and for Aged Care, exchanging the Housing portfolio for Health in 1996. In 1999 he resigned his seat to contest the lower house seat of Gisborne, but he was defeated.
