= Electoral district of Gisborne =

Former state electoral district of Victoria, Australia

Gisborne Victoria—Legislative Assembly
- State: Victoria
- Created: 1967
- Abolished: 2002
- Namesake: Town of Gisborne
- Demographic: Rural
- Coordinates: 37°29′S 144°35′E

The Electoral district of Gisborne was an electoral district of the Victorian Legislative Assembly. It was created in 1967 and abolished in 2002.

A notable member was Athol Guy, of the folk/pop group The Seekers.

== Members ==
Member	Party	Term
Julian Doyle	Liberal	1967–1971 ^{[r]}
Athol Guy ^{[b]}	Liberal	1971–1979 ^{[r]}
Tom Reynolds	Liberal	1979–1999
Jo Duncan	Labor	1999–2002

^{[b]} = by-election
^{[r]} = resigned

== See also ==
- Parliaments of the Australian states and territories
- List of members of the Victorian Legislative Assembly
