= Geoff Howard =

Australian politician

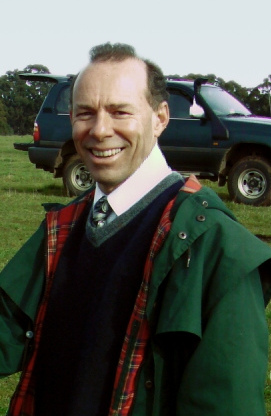
- Geoff Howard, 2010

Member of the Victorian Legislative Assembly for Buninyong
- In office 29 November 2014 – 30 October 2018
- Preceded by: New seat
- Succeeded by: Michaela Settle

Member of the Victorian Legislative Assembly for Ballarat East
- In office 18 September 1999 – 29 November 2014
- Preceded by: Barry Traynor
- Succeeded by: Seat abolished

Personal details
- Born: Geoffrey Kemp Howard; 8 November 1955 (age 70) Geelong, Victoria, Australia
- Party: Labor Party
- Website: home.vicnet.net.au/~ghoward/

Geoffrey Kemp Howard (born 8 November 1955) is an Australian politician. He was a Labor Party member of the Victorian Legislative Assembly, representing Ballarat East from 1999 to 2014, and Buninyong from 2014 to 2018.

== Life and work ==
Howard was born at Geelong, Victoria, and attended public schools in Belmont and Geelong. He received a Bachelor of Agricultural Science in 1977 from the University of Melbourne and a Graduate Diploma of Education in 1979 from State College Rusden. He became a secondary school teacher at Kaniva in 1980, moving to Ballarat in 1982. He joined the Labor Party in 1987, and was elected to Ballarat City Council in 1989. He was mayor in 1993 and 1994, but left the council in 1994, only to return in 1996.

Howard left the council in 1999 after he was preselected as the Labor candidate for the Liberal-held seat of Ballarat East prior to the 1999 state election. At the election, Howard defeated sitting MP Barry Traynor. He was immediately appointed Parliamentary Secretary for Natural Resources and the Environment in 1999, moving to Parliamentary Secretary for Agriculture in 2002. In 2006, he lost his parliamentary secretary position, and became chair of the Education and Training Committee.

Victorian Legislative Assembly
Preceded by Barry Traynor	Member for Ballarat East; 1999–2014	Abolished
New seat	Member for Buninyong; 2014–2018	Succeeded by Michaela Settle
