= List of places on the Victorian Heritage Register in the City of Moonee Valley =

This is a list of places on the Victorian Heritage Register in the City of Moonee Valley in Victoria, Australia. The Victorian Heritage Register is maintained by the Heritage Council of Victoria.

The Victorian Heritage Register, as of 2020, lists the following 25 state-registered places within the City of Moonee Valley:

Place name	Place #	Location	Suburb or Town	Co-ordinates	Built	State registered	Photo
Albion Viaduct (Note: Also included on the VHR for the City of Brimbank.)	H1197	over the Maribyrnong River	Keilor East and Sunshine North	37°44′49″S 144°50′47″E	1927-29	19 September 1996	
Ascot Vale tram substation	H2323	53 Maribyrnong Rd	Ascot Vale	37°46′21″S 144°55′16″E	1925	12 December 2013	
Canary Island Date Palm Avenue	H1200	Mount Alexander Road	Essendon	37°45′06″S 144°54′54″E	1929	19 September 1996	
Clydebank	H1325	22 Vida St	Aberfeldie	37°45′25″S 144°53′53″E	1888	19 June 1997	
E. S. & A. Bank building	H1287	403-405 Mount Alexander Road	Ascot Vale	37°46′28″S 144°55′39″E	1884	10 August 2017	
Essendon High School	H1294	286 Buckley St	Essendon	37°45′17″S 144°54′08″E	1912-13	20 February 1997	
Essendon Incinerator Complex	H0434	180 Holmes Rd	Aberfeldie	37°45′52″S 144°54′11″E	1929-30	31 January 1979	
Essendon railway station	H1562	2-26 Russell St	Essendon	37°45′22″S 144°54′59″E	1909	20 August 1982	
Essendon Technical School (former)	H1295	38 Buckley St	Essendon	37°45′27″S 144°55′24″E	1938-39	20 February 1997	
Essendon Tramway Depot	H1215	318 Mt Alexander Rd	Travancore	37°46′44″S 144°55′53″E	1906	24 October 1996	
Flemington Court House	H1470	28 Wellington St	Flemington	37°47′08″S 144°55′55″E	1889	21 December 1988	
Flemington Police Station and Lock-Up	H0844	30 Wellington St	Flemington	37°47′07″S 144°55′56″E	1890-91	6 February 1991	
Flemington Post Office (Note: Also on the Commonwealth Heritage List.)	H1201	2A Wellington St	Flemington	37°47′14″S 144°55′55″E	1889-90	19 September 1996	
Glendalough	H1202	197-199 Cashmere St	Travancore	37°46′42″S 144°56′02″E	1923	19 September 1996	
Infant Building, Moonee Ponds West Primary School	H1321	123 Eglinton St	Moonee Ponds	37°46′08″S 144°54′32″E	1911-13	19 June 1997	
Lowther Hall Anglican Grammar School	H0146	29 Leslie Rd	Essendon	37°45′34″S 144°54′54″E	1890	9 October 1974	
Newmarket railway substation	H1199	132-164 Newmarket St	Flemington	37°47′04″S 144°55′34″E	1914-15	19 September 1996	
North Park	H1286	69 Woodland St	Essendon	37°44′37″S 144°55′25″E	1888	9 January 1997	
Nathan's Terrace	H1205	4-14 Wellington St and 1-11 Shields St	Flemington	37°47′13″S 144°55′55″E	1889	24 October 1996	
Old Moonee Ponds Court House	H1051	770 Mt Alexander Rd	Moonee Ponds	37°45′52″S 144°55′27″E	1890	8 September 1994	
Park View	H1203	512-518 Racecourse Rd	Flemington	37°47′14″S 144°55′23″E	1924	19 September 1996	
Prefabricated residence	H1207	51 Ormond Rd	Moonee Ponds	37°46′22″S 144°55′53″E	1914-15	24 October 1996	
Curator's Cottage in Queens Park	H1078	776-780 Mt Alexander Rd	Moonee Ponds	37°45′43″S 144°55′23″E	1891-98	20 April 1995	
Moderne house	H1160	2 Riverview Rd	Essendon	37°45′35″S 144°54′48″E	1935	18 April 1996	
St Monica's Catholic Church	H1217	818 Mt Alexander Rd	Moonee Ponds	37°45′36″S 144°55′17″E	1934	24 October 1996	
