= Moonee Ponds Court House =

Former court house in Melbourne, Victoria, Australia

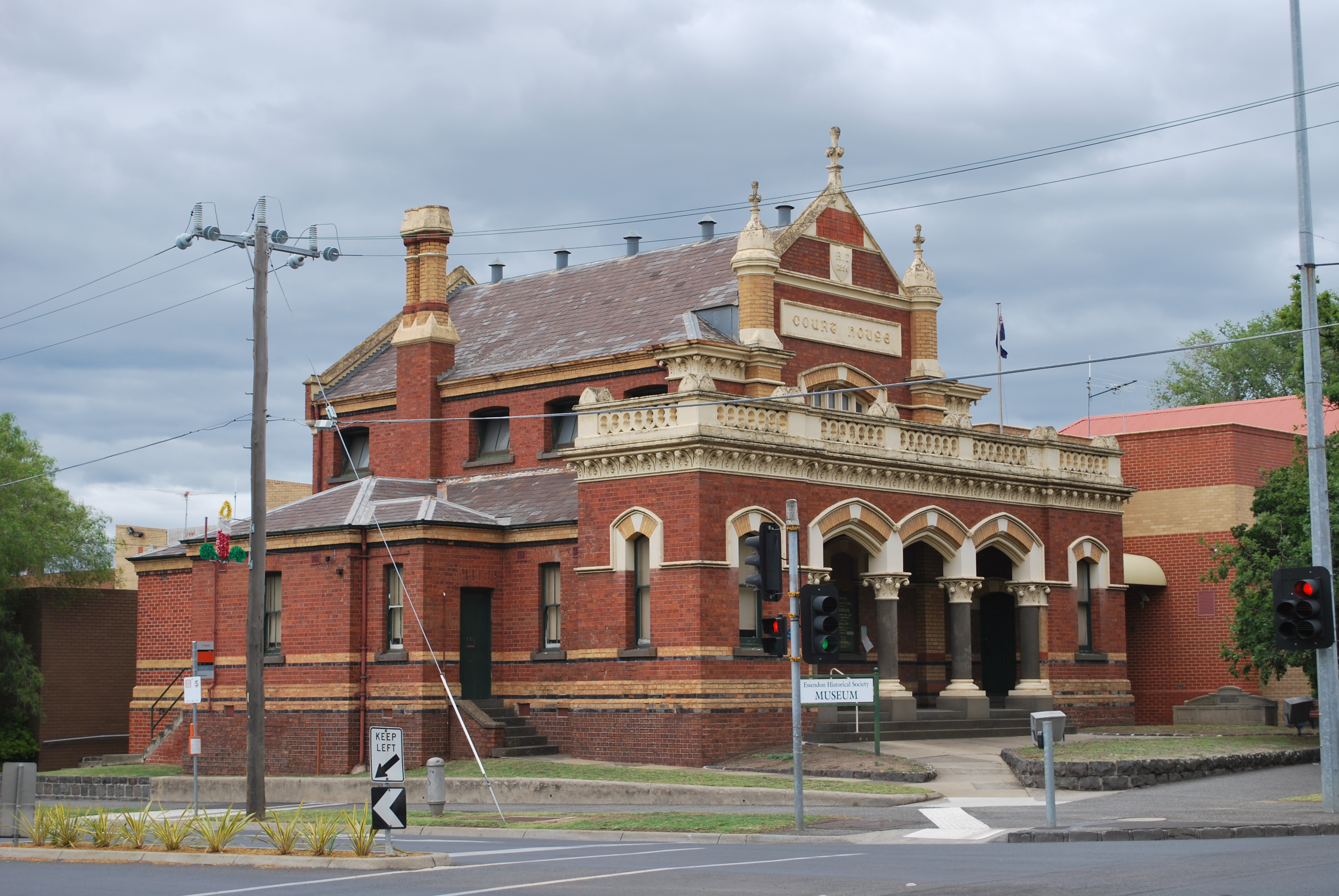
- The former court house in 2009

- Location within Melbourne
- Former names: Essendon Court House (1890–1949)

General information
- Status: Completed
- Type: Court house (1890–1975)
- Architectural style: Medieval Revival
- Location: 770 Mount Alexander Road, Moonee Ponds, Melbourne, Victoria, Australia
- Coordinates: 37.7645°S 144.924°E
- Current tenants: Essendon Historical Society (since 1981)
- Year built: 1889–1890
- Completed: 18 August 1890; 136 years ago

Technical details
- Material: Polychrome red bricks; slate; timber
- Floor count: 2

Design and construction
- Architect: Samuel Ebden Bindley
- Architecture firm: Public Works Department
- Main contractor: Henry Franklyn

Victorian Heritage Register
- Official name: Former Moonee Ponds Court House
- Type: Registered place
- Designated: 8 September 1994
- Reference no.: H1051
- Heritage overlay no.: HO84
- Category: Law Enforcement

Register of the National Estate
- Official name: Essendon Court House (former)
- Type: Defunct register
- Designated: 21 March 1978
- Reference no.: 5469

The Moonee Ponds Court House, also known as the Essendon Court House, is a former court house located at 770 Mount Alexander Road, in Moonee Ponds, an inner-western suburb of Melbourne, in Victoria, Australia. Completed in 1890, the building ceased use as a court house in 1975 and was repurposed as a history museum in 1981.

The former court house was added to the Victorian Heritage Register on 8 September 1994 in recognition of its historical and architectural significance; and was added to the non-statutory and now defunct Register of the National Estate on 21 March 1978.

== History ==
The Essendon Court of Petty Sessions has been located in five different locations dating from 1860. On 5 August 1889, the Essendon Borough Council was advised by the Crown Law Department that a new courthouse will be erected in Moonee Ponds. On 14 October 1889, Henry Franklyn was awarded a contract to build the court house. Officially opened on 18 August 1890, the former court house is associated with the adjudication of minor offences, as a Magistrates' Court, with more serious matters referred to superior courts. The name of the courthouse was changed from Essendon to the Moonee Ponds Court House on 1 May 1949.

On 27 April 1973, a new courthouse was opened on Kellaway Avenue, and the court's functions were transferred to the new building. The former courthouse continued to be used for several years as an overflow court. The final case to be heard in this building was in 1975, and, in 1981, was repurposed as a history museum, operated by the Essendon Historical Society.

A faulty light transformer caused a fire in the upper floor of the two-storey building in June 2016 destroyed the roof and damaged the period timber woodwork. Some historical records were also destroyed. A $1.5 million grant by the Victorian Government in 2017 enabled restoration of damaged and improved fire safety equipment, and the building was reopened as a museum in 2021.

== Description ==
The former Essendon Court House was built in 1890 and was in operation as a Court House until the mid 1970s. Architecturally, the design is a notable example of a typological subset within the significant public buildings designs of the late nineteenth century in Victoria. It is significant for architectural reasons and is a representative and well preserved example of court house design in Victoria.

The former Essendon Court House provides an example of an architectural style in its use of uncommon and successfully adapted stylistic elements from medieval sources, in contrast to the earlier classical stylistic dominance. It is a representative example of the architect, Samuel Ebden Bindley's work, who is credited as initiating some of the most innovative designs in the collectively notable public works output of the late nineteenth and early twentieth century, of which the court house is one of fourteen extant buildings designed by Bindley, listed on the Victorian Heritage Register.

As a combination, the polychrome brick, stone and polished timber finishes are an outstanding use of particular materials, following the tenets of the various Medieval Revival styles in contemporary Britain.

== See also ==
- List of places on the Victorian Heritage Register in the City of Moonee Valley
