= Queens Park, Moonee Ponds =

Park and heritage-listed cottage in Melbourne, Victoria, Australia

Queens Park
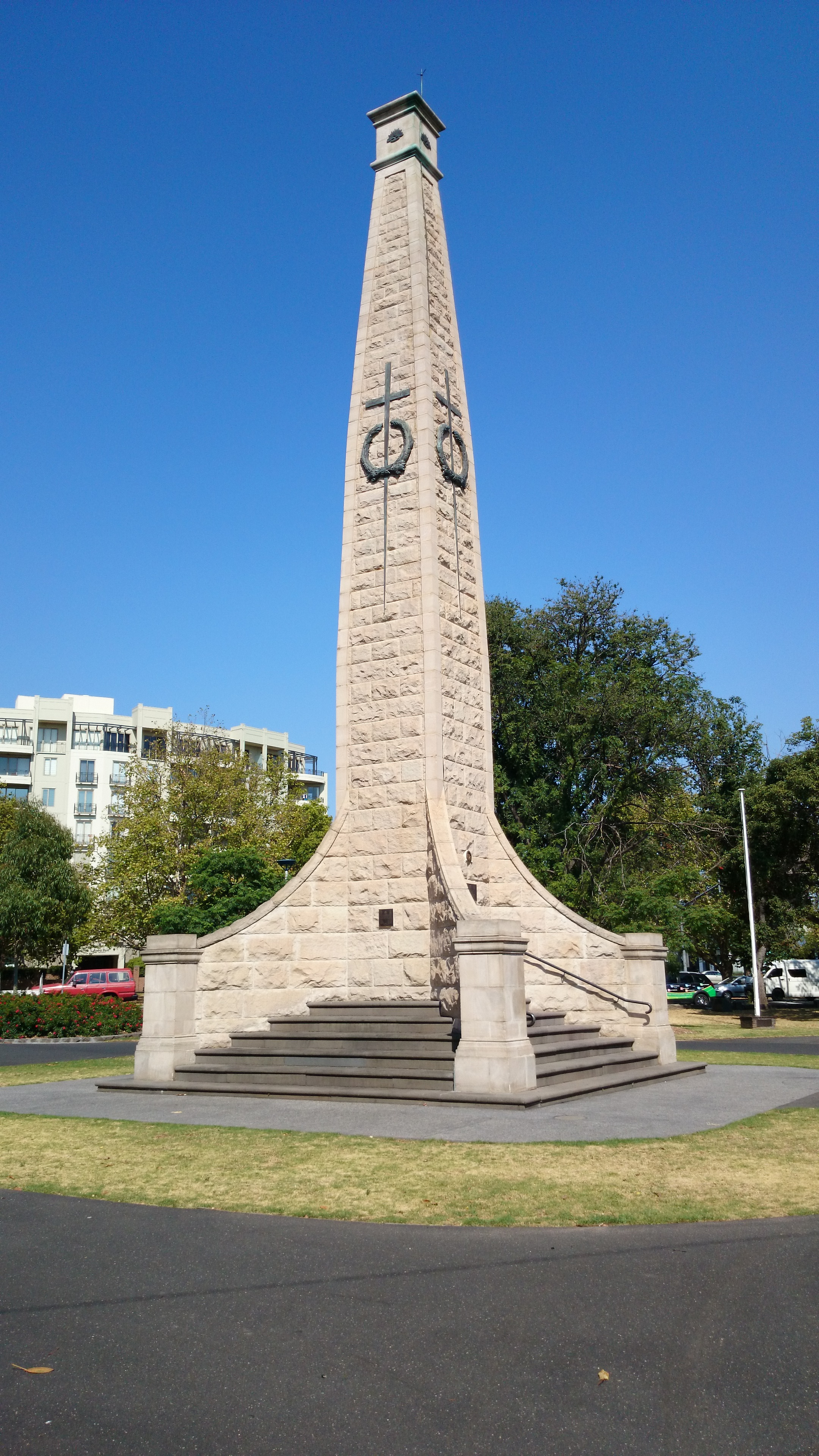
- World War II memorial in the park, in 2014

- Location within Melbourne
- Interactive map of Queens Park
- Type: Urban park
- Location: Moonee Ponds, Melbourne, Victoria, Australia
- Coordinates: 37°45′45″S 144°55′27″E
- Established: 1884; 142 years ago
- Designer: John Oliver
- Owner: City of Moonee Valley

Curator's Cottage

General information
- Type: Worker's cottage (1898–1990)
- Architectural style: Victorian Rustic Gothic
- Location: 776-780 Mount Alexander Road, Moonee Ponds, Melbourne, Victoria, Australia
- Coordinates: 37°45′43″S 144°55′23″E
- Year built: 1891–1898

Technical details
- Material: Timber

Victorian Heritage Register
- Official name: Former Curator's Cottage, Queen's Park
- Type: Registered place
- Designated: 20 April 1995
- Reference no.: H1078
- Heritage overlay no.: HO69
- Category: Residential buildings (private)

The Queens Park (Note: Originally known as Victoria Park, then renamed as Queen's Park in 1897; in more recent times, the apostrophe has been dropped from the park's name.) is an urban park in Moonee Ponds, an inner-western suburb of Melbourne, in Victoria, Australia. The park is bounded by Mount Alexander Road, The Strand, Pascoe Vale Road, and Kellaway Avenue.

Located within the park is the Curator's Cottage , a cottage for the former curator, completed in 1898, that was added to the Victorian Heritage Register on 20 April 1995 in recognition of its architectural, historic and aesthetic significance. The cottage was subsequently repurposed as a cafe.

== History ==
The area now known as Queens Park was once the site of a natural watering hole for the Doutta Gala Aboriginal people, surrounded by red gums. Following the discovery of gold in Victoria in 1851, travellers heading for the goldfields met at the watering hole due to the supply of fresh water. On 20 August 1860, the Burke and Wills expedition camped here on the first night of their fateful journey to cross Australia.

In 1865, Baron Ferdinand Von Mueller, the Director of the Melbourne Botanic Gardens, sent plant 250 specimens to the Essendon Borough Council, many of which were planted at Queens Park.

The site was reserved for ornamental plantation in 1884, and in the 1890s plans were drawn up for the creation of an urban park by the Essendon Borough Council and John Oliver, the first curator. A fund was established to beautify the lake in celebration of the Diamond Jubilee of Queen Victoria.

== Description ==
The focal point of the park is its 1898 picturesque cottage with its idyllic surrounds and public art pieces. A sealed path surrounds the lake where seats and picnic tables are provided beneath old established native and exotic trees, with the lake a haven for a variety of birds. A tropical garden, sunken garden and native gardens are some of the many attractions of the park. Concerts and other entertainments are common on weekends. The park boasts an extensive botanic collection, including established Moreton Bay figs, bunya pines and hoop pines. It also features a cycad collection, several native/indigenous gardens, seasonal annual displays, and an Asian-styled garden.

In addition to the cottage/cafe, the park includes the Moonee Ponds Bowling Club and the Queens Park Pool.

=== Curator's Cottage ===
Plans for the Swiss cottage were approved by the Essendon Council in 1891 and the cottage was completed in 1898. (Note: The Master Plan Report states the cottage was completed in 1892.) The timber building was designed as a house for the curator and continued to be used as the residence for the superintendent of gardens until 1990.

The cottage has artistic associations with the Picturesque landscape movement of the early nineteenth century Britain, demonstrated by the use of the Victorian Rustic Gothic style in a landscaped setting next to the ornamental lake in Queen's Park. As possibly the only example of a timber Victorian Rustic Gothic curator's cottage and the only known example with a shingled roof and dormers, the building is a relatively rare and extraordinary example of a curator's cottage in a large public garden. Mosaics are located surrounding the cottage.

The building demonstrates outstanding craftsmanship and decoration in the use of shingles to the roof, scalloped shingles to the walls, decorative criss-cross timber valance, timber finials and tied pendants, including smaller finials to the three dormers. It represents the important functions played by the curator in public gardens. The curator was involved not only in the development and management of the gardens, and also their protection and security. The cottage, located in a prominent and central position near the lake and once adjacent to the now demolished conservatory, reflects the roles of the curator.

The cottage demonstrates an association with John Oliver, the first curator at Queen's Park, who was appointed in 1891 and who retired in 1938. Oliver also worked at Ballarat Botanical Gardens and the Chirnside's estate at Werribee and advised on the designs for the gardens at Duntroon Military College and for other municipalities.

== Gallery ==
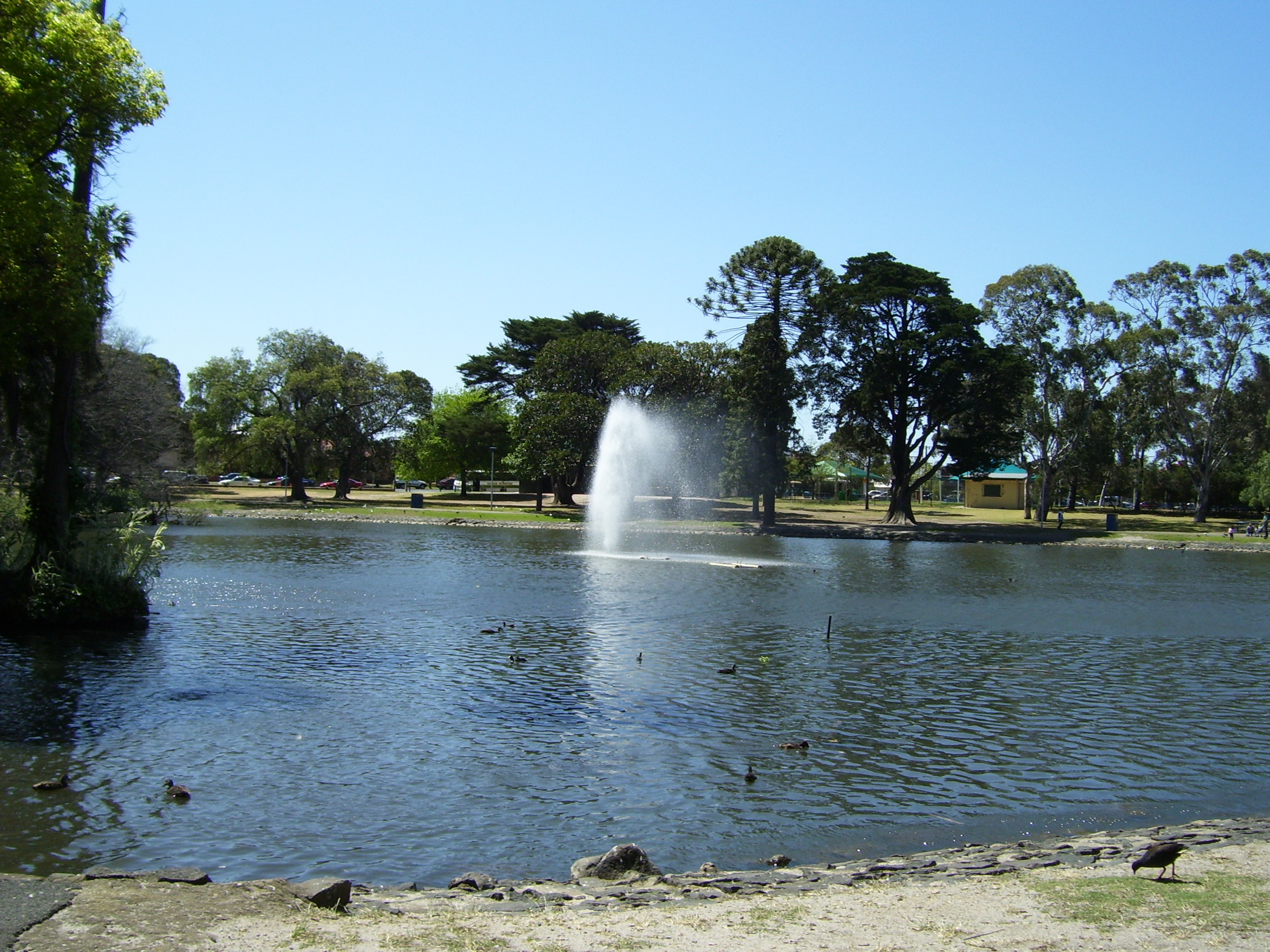
The park's fountain

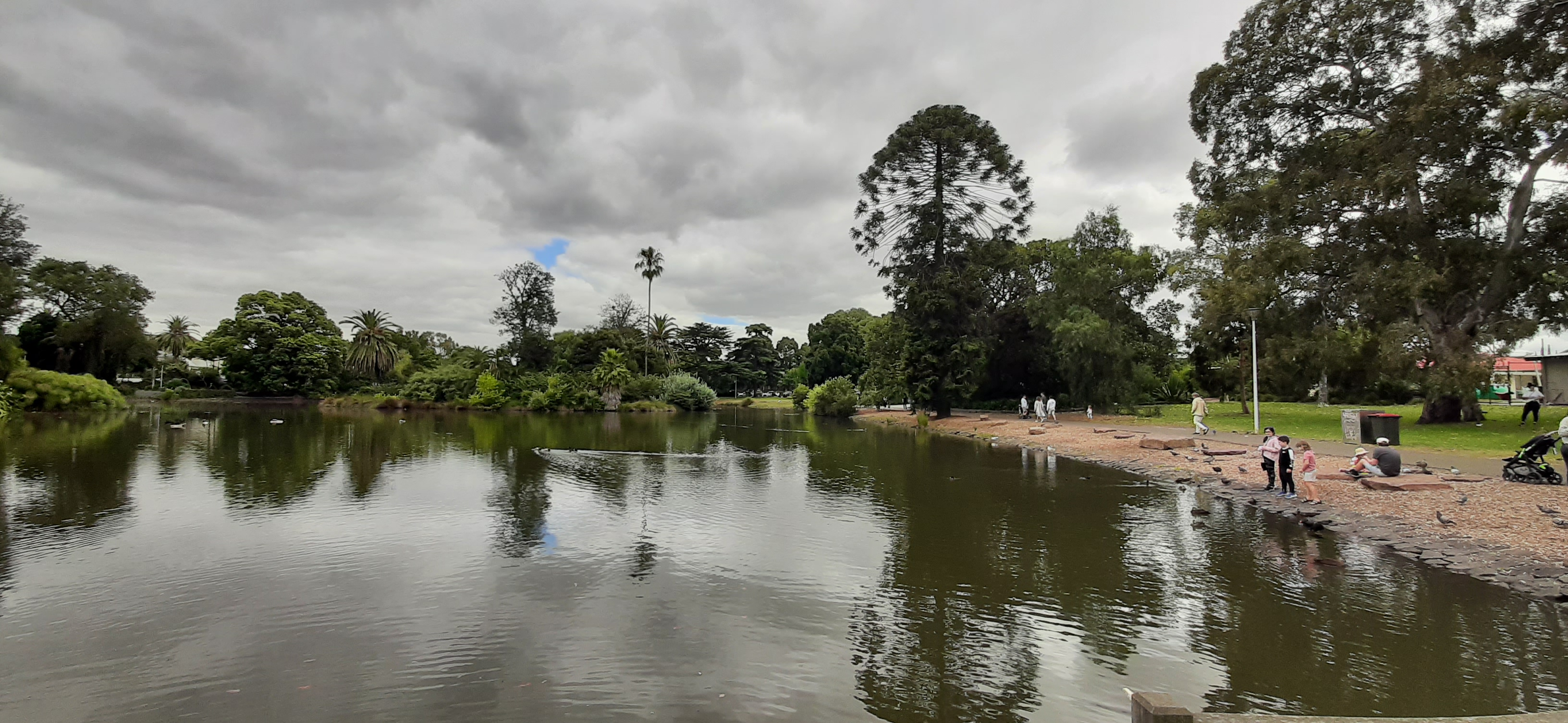
The park's lake

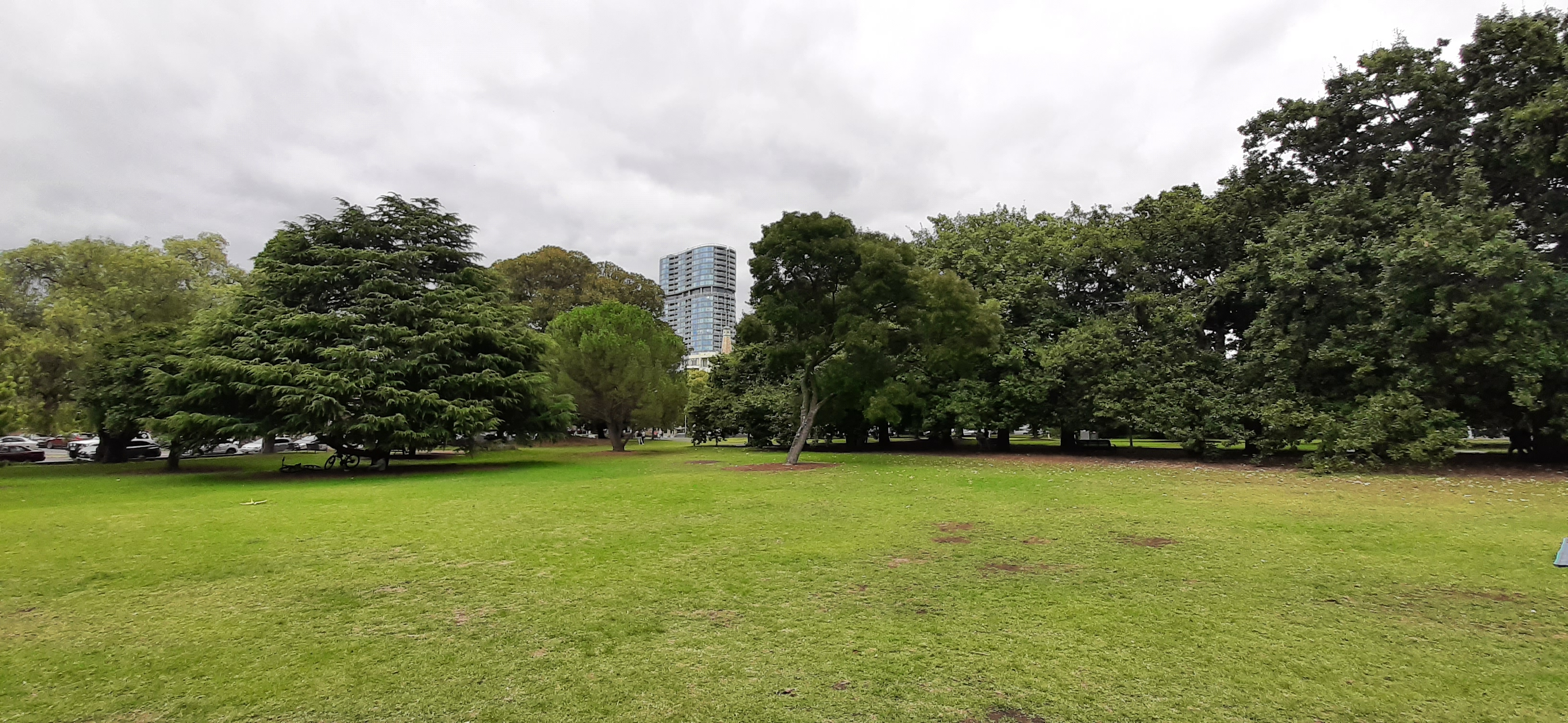
A grassy area beside Pascoe Vale Road

== See also ==
- Architecture of Melbourne
- List of parks in Melbourne
- List of places on the Victorian Heritage Register in the City of Moonee Valley
