= City of Essendon =

Coordinates: 37°45′07″S 144°54′32″E

- Local government area
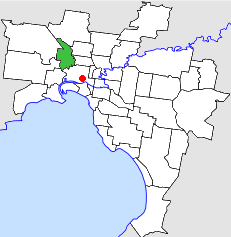
- Location in Melbourne

- The extent of the City of Essendon between April 1992 and November 1993
- Country: Australia
- State: Victoria
- Region: West Melbourne
- Established: 1861
- Council seat: Moonee Ponds

Area
  - Total: 21.22 km^{2} (8.19 sq mi)

Population
  - Total: 57,000 (1992)
  - Density: 2,686/km^{2} (6,960/sq mi)
- County: Bourke
LGAs around City of Essendon
Keilor	Broadmeadows	Coburg
Keilor	City of Essendon	Brunswick
Sunshine	Melbourne	Melbourne

The City of Essendon was a local government area about 5 kilometres (3 mi) northwest of Melbourne, the state capital of Victoria, Australia. The city covered an area of 21.22 square kilometres (8.19 sq mi), and existed from 1861 until 1994.

== History ==
Essendon was first incorporated as a borough on 27 December 1861. It became a town on 10 January 1890, and was proclaimed a city on 16 April 1909.

Essendon initially incorporated the suburbs of Flemington and Kensington, but these suburbs split away to form the Borough of Flemington and Kensington on 17 March 1882, which merged in 1905 with the City of Melbourne. On 1 October 1979, Essendon gained Strathmore and Strathmore Heights from the City of Broadmeadows - a gain of 5.76 square kilometres (2.22 sq mi).

On 1 April 1992, Essendon gained the Essendon North area from the City of Keilor following a poll of residents. In 1993, Essendon once again gained parts of Flemington and Kensington, as well as parts of North Melbourne, from the City of Melbourne. The Royal Melbourne Showgrounds, however, was annexed to Melbourne.

On 15 December 1994, the City of Essendon was abolished, and along with suburbs of the City of Keilor east of the Albion-Jacana freight railway line, was merged into the newly created City of Moonee Valley.

From 1886 until 1973, council meetings were held at what is now the Clocktower Centre, on Mount Alexander Road, Moonee Ponds, and from 1973 until 1994, they were held at the Essendon Civic Centre, on Pascoe Vale Road, approximately 200 metres (656 ft) to the north. The former is now a performing arts centre while the latter is the headquarters for the City of Moonee Valley.

The telephone exchange codes for this area began 37x. Until the 1960s, it was covered by the alphabetical exchange code FU (translating to 37 on the keypad).

== Wards ==
On 1 October 1979, the City of Essendon was subdivided into four wards:

- Aberfeldie Ward
- Ascot Vale Ward
- Essendon Ward
- Moonee Ponds Ward

At dissolution, each ward elected three councillors.

== Suburbs ==
- Aberfeldie
- Ascot Vale
- Essendon
- Essendon North
- Flemington (a small triangle between the Flemington Racecourse railway line, Epsom Road and Ascot Vale Road)
- Kensington (shared with the City of Melbourne)
- Moonee Ponds*
- North Melbourne (shared with the City of Melbourne)
- Strathmore
- Strathmore Heights

* Council seat.

== Population ==
Year	Population
1954	57,873
1958	59,500*
1961	58,987
1966	58,210
1971	57,583
1976	51,133+
1981	56,380
1986	53,977
1991	52,721

* Estimate in the 1958 Victorian Year Book.
+ The area annexed in 1979 contained a further 8,892 people, so the combined figure is 60,025.
