= Ormond Road house, Moonee Ponds =

House in Melbourne, Victoria, Australia

Ormond Road house
- Location within Melbourne

General information
- Status: Completed
- Type: Prefabricated house
- Architectural style: Edwardian
- Location: 51 Ormond Road, Moonee Ponds, Melbourne, Victoria, Australia
- Coordinates: 37°46′22″S 144°55′53″E
- Completed: c. 1840s
- Relocated: c. 1915; 111 years ago
- Client: James H. Bennet; William Little

Technical details
- Material: Teak; slate; galvanized iron
- Grounds: 848 m^{2} (9,130 sq ft)

Design and construction
- Main contractor: John Wilson

Victorian Heritage Register
- Official name: Prefabricated Residence
- Type: Registered place
- Designated: 24 October 1996
- Reference no.: H1207
- Heritage overlay no.: HO90
- Category: Residential buildings (private)

The Ormond Road house is a prefabricated house at 51 Ormond Road, in Moonee Ponds, an inner-western suburb of Melbourne, Australia. It is likely that the house was built in the 1840s, outside Australia, and erected in its current location in the 1910s.

The house was added to the Victorian Heritage Register on 24 October 1996 in recognition of its architectural significance. In April 2021, the house was included in a report by the Portable Buildings World Heritage Nomination Task Force, as part of the nomination process for the addition of notable 19th-century prefabricated and portable buildings in Australia, to be added to the UNESCO World Heritage List.

== Description ==
The residence at 51 Ormond Street, Moonee Ponds is a prefabricated timber (teak), panellised bungalow-style house with two attic rooms and a high-hipped slate roof with dormers. A timber-framed verandah with a concave galvanised steel roof, a cast iron narrow frieze and brackets embraces the whole building. The internal layout is symmetrical around a central line through the front door. All finishes appear to be original although some changes are evident in the different panel mouldings (sympathetic to the original fabric) and raised wall height, and the chimney intrusions in the two front rooms.

The residence was erected by John Wilson for James H. Bennet and William Little at an unknown location and was relocated to its current site around 1914–15. Its unusual moulded panelling, which is one metre (three feet) wide and self-supporting, and its method of construction, which incorporates the use of cover straps rather than structural posts placed between the panels, suggests that the house dates from c. 1840. Its origin appears to be either American, Australian, or Colonial French. (Note: Miles stated in 1985, that due to its modular metric measurements, the house appeared to not be of "…British, United States or Australian origin[s].")

The house is of architectural significant as a rare and preserved example of a modular panel prefabricated building based on the metric rather than imperial system. The residence is also of architectural significance as it demonstrates an unusual process of construction whereby the panels are placed side by side and joined with a timber cover strap. The more usual method was the widely recognised Manning system, where the wall panels were fitted between grooved posts. The building is one of only two known examples of panellised prefabrication, the other being Seymour Cottage at Romsey.

== See also ==
- Architecture of Melbourne
- List of places on the Victorian Heritage Register in the City of Moonee Valley
