= Nathan's Terrace =

House in Melbourne, Victoria, Australia

- Interactive map of the Nathan's Terrace area

General information
- Status: Completed
- Type: Terrace houses
- Architectural style: Victorian boom style
- Location: 4-14 Wellington and 1-11 Shields streets, Flemington, Melbourne, Victoria, Australia
- Coordinates: 37°47′13″S 144°55′55″E
- Completed: 1889; 137 years ago
- Client: Samuel Nathan

Technical details
- Material: Reinforced concrete; bricks; tiles; timber; lead-lighting
- Floor count: 2

Design and construction
- Architect: William Wolf
- Developer: Samuel Nathan
- Main contractor: O'Dea & Kennedy

Victorian Heritage Register
- Official name: Nathan's Terrace
- Type: Registered place
- Designated: 24 October 1996
- Reference no.: H1205
- Heritage overlay no.: HO122
- Category: Residential buildings (private)

Nathan's Terrace is a series of terrace houses, located in Flemington, an inner western suburb of Melbourne, in Victoria, Australia. The terrace houses, located at 4-14 Wellington and 1-11 Shields streets, were added to the Victorian Heritage Register on 24 October 1996 in recognition of their architectural, historical and social significance.

== Description ==
Nathan's Terrace comprises twelve single-storey terrace houses on two street frontages – Wellington and Shields streets – that were developed by Melbourne furniture retailer, Samuel Nathan, during the land boom of the late 1880s.

The buildings were designed by architect William Wolf and constructed by O'Dea & Kennedy during 1889. As a result of the financial depression of the 1890s, Nathan sold the houses to separate purchasers. Since then, apart from a period during the 1920s and 1930s – when all houses were the property of a builder, Robert Spurway – the houses have always been separately owned. The two houses on the north end of the Wellington Street group are particularly small and have contorted internal layouts. Most of the twelve terrace houses have small rear yards.

Nathan's Terrace is architecturally significant as an unusually compact 1880s boom period residential subdivision that has a back to back layout facing two street frontages. These modest-sized, but prominent terrace houses are architecturally significant for their skilful use of the sloping site, their breakfront design on the street elevations, and their ornate parapet decorations. They are among Melbourne's most elaborate single-storey terraces. Nathan's Terrace is of further architectural importance as a significant residential work of William Wolf, a prolific architect of the 1880s and 1890s who specialised in the design of substantial suburban hotels. The terrace is an important index to the key design elements of Wolf's oeuvre.

Nathan's Terrace is historically and socially important for its association with the Marvellous Melbourne boom activity of the 1880s when a great deal of private investment capital flowed into increasingly speculative ventures for housing construction.

As of May 2025, each house was selling in the range of $1.2–$1.4 million.

== See also ==
- Architecture of Melbourne
- List of places on the Victorian Heritage Register in the City of Moonee Valley
