= Lilian Wells =

First moderator of the New South Wales Uniting Church Synod

Lilian Wells OBE
- Born: Lilian Charlotte Ault; 15 December 1911; Moonee Ponds, Victoria, Australia
- Died: 3 April 2001 (aged 89); Eastwood, New South Wales, Australia
- Occupation: lay church leader
- Known for: only woman president, Congregational Union of Australia; first moderator of NSW Synod, Uniting Church of Australia

Lilian Wells OBE (1911–2001) was an Australian church leader who served as president of the Congregational Union of Australia, and the first moderator of the New South Wales Synod of the Uniting Church in Australia. She was the only woman to serve in the role of president for the Congregational Union. She served on the joint committee that planned the merger of the Congregationalist, Methodist and Presbyterian churches that formed the Uniting Church in Australia in 1977. She was appointed an Officer of Order of the British Empire in 1977, for her service to the church.

== Early life and education ==
Lilian Charlotte Ault was born on 15 December 1911 in Moonee Ponds, Victoria. She was the first child born to her parents, Frederick Howell Ault and Mabel Lydia Ault (née Leslie). Her father worked as an engineer, and during her secondary school years, the family moved to Hobart, Tasmania, because of a change in his employment. After graduating from the Hobart high school, she attended the University of Tasmania, where she earned a bachelor of arts in 1932 and a master's degree in 1934. She completed a diploma of education at the University of Melbourne in 1935.

Lilian Ault was raised in the Methodist Church and participated in the Australian Student Christian Movement, serving as a Methodist delegate to SCM gatherings in Melbourne and Ballarat. Through her participation in SCM, she met Henry Thomas Wells, a Congregationalist from South Melbourne. The couple married on 11 July 1938, at the Auburn Methodist Church, in Auburn, Victoria. Henry Wells had been ordained a Congregationalist minister in 1937, and began his ministry serving a church in Brunswick, Victoria. The couple had three children together, one son and two daughters.

== Career ==
Lilian Wells spent three years working as a teacher at the Methodist Ladies' College in Melbourne, where she gave instruction in French and German. After her marriage, she focused on raising her three children. As the wife of a minister, she took on significant volunteer roles in the congregations he served, such as teaching Sunday school and participating in the local women's guilds. Over time her participation in the Congregational Women's Fellowship grew from local involvement into holding a regional and then national role. In 1955, she was elected president of the Congregational Women's Fellowship of New South Wales. From 1964 to 1968, she served as the national president of the Congregational Women's Fellowship, as well as the president of South Australia's Congregational Women's Fellowship.

By 1962, Henry Wells had become the minister and president of the Congregational Union of Australia; he served in this role for a two year term. The Wells then travelled to Great Britain, where they stayed from 1966 to 1967. Upon their return to Australia in 1967, they moved to Sydney. Lilian Wells joined the Australian Council of Churches' executive team in 1967. She was also active in the leadership of the Pan-Pacific and South East Asia Women’s Association of Australia. Henry Wells became the secretary for the Congregational Union of Australia, a post he would hold for a decade.

In 1973, Lilian Wells was elected as vice-president for the Congregational Union of New South Wales, the first woman to be so elected. She became president in 1975 and served two years. She was the only woman to ever serve in this role, and the last president. These were dynamic years to be in leadership, as the Congregationalists were in dialogue with Presbyterians and Methodists over a proposed merger that eventually led to the creation of the Uniting Church in Australia. Wells served on the joint planning committee for the merger, and was influential in shaping the new denomination, which was officially formed in June 1977.

Wells was one of two women participating in the inauguration service for the Uniting Church in Australia, held in July 1977. At that gathering, she was confirmed as the moderator of the New South Wales Synod of the Uniting Church in Australia, a position she had held in an interim capacity as the new denomination was formed. She was the only woman in a leadership position in the newly formed church. She served one year as moderator, and in 1978, was succeeded by Ronald Bevan Sparks, who served from 1978 to 1979.

Wells later worked for Amnesty International and taught English as a second language. She also was an advocate for reconciliation with Indigenous people.

== Death and legacy ==
Wells died on 3 April 2001 at Eastwood, New South Wales. The Lilian Wells Nursing Home, now known as Uniting Lilian Wells North Paramattta, was named in her honour in 1991.

== Awards ==
Wells was made an Officer of the Order of the British Empire on 31 December 1977. She was recognized for her service to the church.
