= Clocktower Centre =

Civic building in Melbourne, Australia

Coordinates: 37.765622°S 144.924576°E

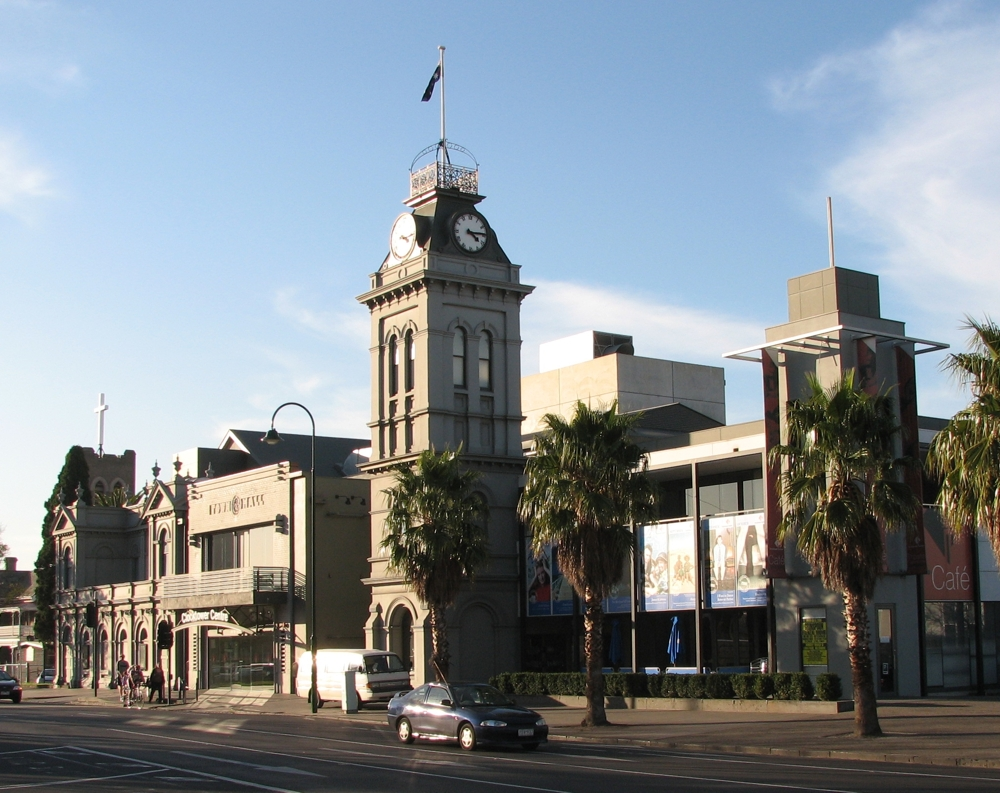
The Clocktower Centre

The Clocktower Centre, previously known as Essendon Town Hall or Moonee Ponds Town Hall, is a civic building in Moonee Ponds in Melbourne, Australia, located at 750 Mount Alexander Road, at the junction with Pascoe Vale Road. Operated by the City of Moonee Valley, it is a venue for performing arts, as well as community and corporate activities.

== Building history ==
The building has evolved substantially over time. It was originally built as the Essendon Mechanics Institute in a Victorian architectural style, and opened in September 1880.

In February 1886, it was rechristened as the Essendon Town Hall. By 1914, the building had been extended and was reopened in July of that year. In 1930, a clock was installed in the tower and, in 1941, the building was again modified, with sections being rebuilt.

After the council chambers were moved to the new civic centre in 1973, the former town hall was converted into a community centre. It was renovated and officially opened as the Essendon Community Centre in 1976. A fire in 1978 caused substantial internal damage to the building but, by 1979, it had been repaired and reopened.

In February 2000, following substantial renovations, the building was officially reopened as the Clocktower Centre.

== See also ==
- List of Town Halls in Melbourne
