= Moonee Ponds West Primary School =

Public primary school in Melbourne, Victoria, Australia

Location
- 123 Eglinton Street, Moonee Ponds, Melbourne, Victoria; Australia; 37.7686°S 144.9093°E

Information
- Type: Public primary school
- Established: 14 February 1888; 138 years ago
- Authority: Victorian Department of Education
- Principal: Jarrod Sutton
- Grades: Foundation—Year 6
- Gender: Co-education
- Enrolment: 320 (as of 2024)
- Website: mooneewestps.vic.edu.au

Site notes
- Architect(s): George William Watson (Public Works Department)
- Architectural style: Edwardian pavilion

Victorian Heritage Register
- Official name: Infant Building, Moonee Ponds West Primary School
- Type: Registered place
- Designated: 19 June 1997
- Reference no.: H1321
- Heritage overlay no.: HO142
- Category: Education

The Moonee Ponds West Primary School is a public primary school, located at 123 Eglinton Street in Moonee Ponds, an inner-western suburb of Melbourne, in Victoria, Australia. Established in 1888, the school's infants' building was completed in 1913 and was added to the Victorian Heritage Register on 19 June 1997 in recognition of its architectural and historical importance.

As of 2024, the school enrolled 320 students.

== History ==
The Moonee Ponds West Primary School, formerly known as the Ascot Vale West State School, opened on 14 February 1888 with 148 children enrolled. Initially expected to accommodate approximately 500 students, by 1893, there were 946 students enrolled, and similar overcrowding occurred at other public primary schools. In 1899, the Fink Commission (1899) which recommended the construction of independent infant schools in Victoria, the first of which was built in Essendon in 1901 and, by 1939, 53 infant buildings were completed.

In 1911 two blocks adjoining the school were acquired as the site for a new, detached infant school building. The Moonee Ponds West Primary School was completed in the pavilion style, an Edwardian design adopted by the Public Works Department for infant buildings constructed between 1907 and 1915. Designed by Public Works architect George William Watson, the Moonee Ponds West infant building opened in June 1913.

== Description ==
The infant building is an intact, representative example of the pavilion style building which was designed for preparatory grade children during the Edwardian years. The interior is significant for retaining the original floor plan and layout of seven classrooms, cloak room, office and large central hall. The decorative elements of the hall interior are particularly noteworthy; the west, east and south elevations feature stained glass windows depicting rosellas, galahs, magpies and kookaburras, and the ceiling has a polished timber hammer beam roof studded with decorative, square-shaped ventilator openings. Of further historical interest is the large, polished timber honour board on the north wall commemorating past students who served in World War I. The exterior is important for the same degree of intactness, as it retains all the Edwardian elements of the building's pavilion design, notably the octagonal-plan domed ventilators which prominently feature in the decorative massing of the roofscape.

== See also ==
- List of government schools in Victoria
- List of places on the Victorian Heritage Register in the City of Moonee Valley
