= Moderne house, Riverview Road, Essendon =

House in Melbourne, Victoria, Australia

Moderne house, Riverview Road
- Location within Melbourne

General information
- Status: Completed
- Type: House
- Architectural style: European Moderne
- Location: 2 Riverview Road, Essendon, Melbourne, Victoria, Australia
- Coordinates: 37°45′35″S 144°54′48″E
- Completed: 1935; 91 years ago
- Client: Evan Price

Technical details
- Material: Bricks
- Floor count: 2
- Floor area: 233 m^{2} (2,510 sq ft)

Design and construction
- Architects: Geoffrey Mewton; Roy Grounds
- Architecture firm: Mewton and Grounds
- Main contractor: C. Hutley

Victorian Heritage Register
- Official name: Residence
- Type: Registered place
- Designated: 18 April 1996
- Reference no.: H1160
- Heritage overlay no.: HO108
- Category: Residential buildings (private)

The Moderne house is a house at 2 Riverview Road, in Essendon, an inner-western suburb of Melbourne, Australia. Completed in 1935, the house was added to the Victorian Heritage Register on 18 April 1996 in recognition of its architectural significance.

== Description ==
The house at 2 Riverview Road, Essendon was designed in the European Moderne style in 1935 for Evan Price by the avant-garde architects Geoffrey Mewton and Roy Grounds, of Mewton and Grounds. The builder was C. Hutley of Brighton.

The house is predominantly two-storey five-bedroom house with face brickwork. The roofs are flat and there is a combination of parapets and projecting eaves. The house is a successful local adaptation of European Moderne and remains today as a rare, relatively intact example of a design type.

Mewton and Grounds were influential in the development of modernist architecture in Victoria and the style, technology and construction technique of the house at 2 Riverview Road demonstrates their philosophies and intent through its open plan form and functional design.

== See also ==
- Architecture of Melbourne
- List of places on the Victorian Heritage Register in the City of Moonee Valley
