= Ascot Vale tram substation =

Historical electrical tram substation in Melbourne, Victoria, Australia

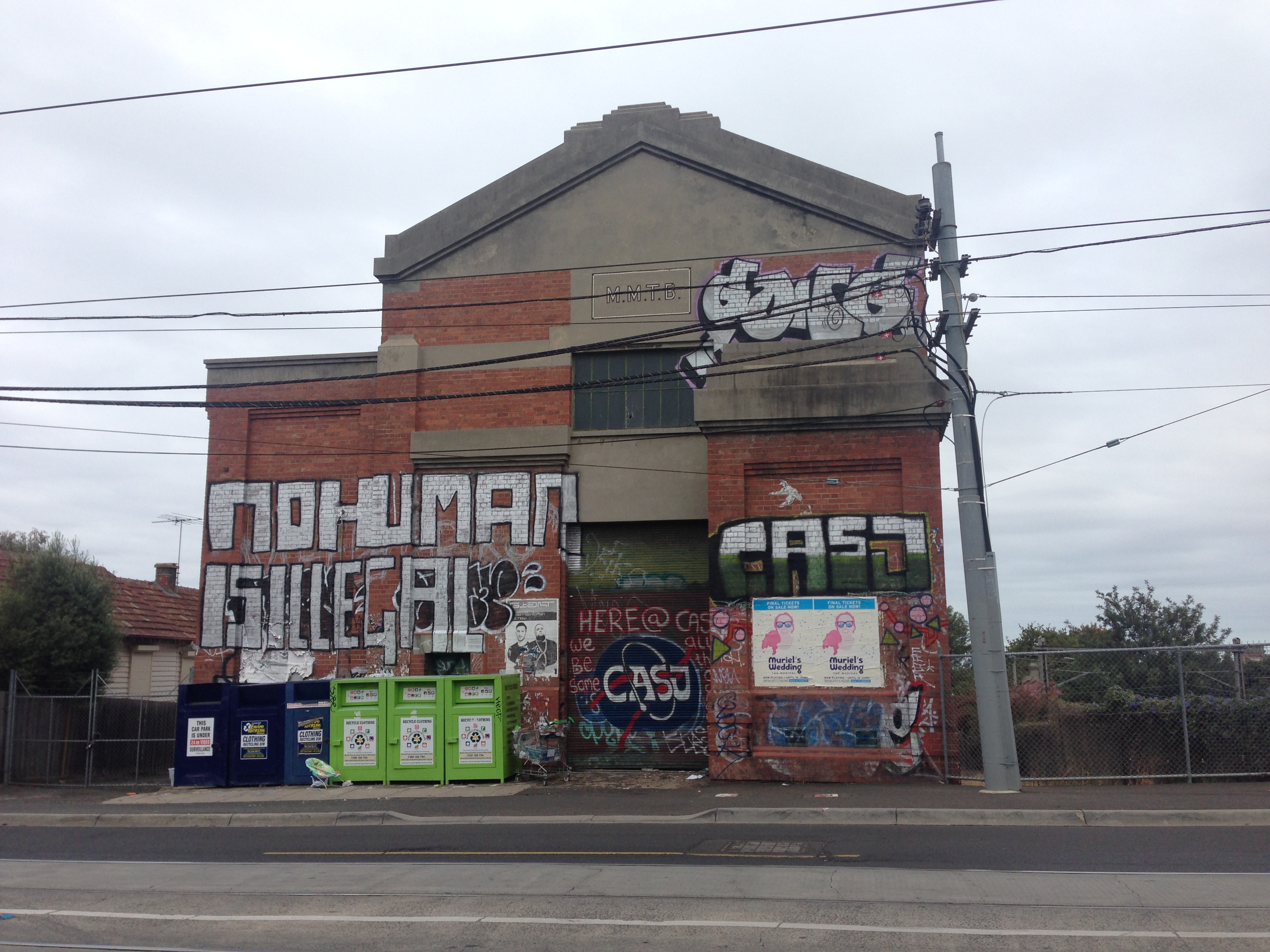
- The substation in 2019

- Location of the substation in Melbourne
- Interactive map of Ascot Vale tram substation
- 37°46′21″S 144°55′16″E
- Type: Electrical substation (former)
- Location: 53 Maribyrnong Road, Ascot Vale, Melbourne, Victoria, Australia

History
- Built: 1925; 101 years ago
- Built for: Melbourne & Metropolitan Tramways Board
- Decommissioned: 2005

Site notes
- Material: Red brick; concrete
- Architect: Alan Monsborough
- Architectural style: Inter-war Stripped Classical
- Condition: abandoned
- Current use: vacant
- Owner: Yarra Trams
- Public access: No

Victorian Heritage Register
- Official name: Ascot Vale tram substation
- Type: Registered place
- Criteria: A, D
- Designated: 12 December 2013
- Reference no.: H2323
- Category: Transport - Tramways

The Ascot Vale tram substation is a former electrical substation located at 53 Maribyrnong Road, in Ascot Vale, an inner western suburb of Melbourne, in Victoria, Australia. The substation was completed in 1925 and designed by Alan Monsborough in the Inter-war Stripped Classical style on behalf of the Melbourne & Metropolitan Tramways Board.

Located on the traditional lands of the Wurundjeri, the former substation was added to the Victorian Heritage Register on 12 December 2013 in recognition of its historical and architectural significance. On the same date, the Victorian Government added substations at Carlton, and Camberwell, and former substations at Brunswick, Elsternwick, Maribyrnong, and South Yarra to the same heritage register.

== History ==
In 1919, the Melbourne & Metropolitan Tramways Board (M&MTB) was established to electrify and extend Melbourne's existing cable and electric tram routes. Electrical substations were built to take electricity from the State Electricity Commission energy grid system to power the newly-established electric tram lines.

The North Melbourne Electric Tramways and Lighting Company Limited (NMETL), also known as the Essendon Tramways, established the Maribyrnong tram line in 1906. NMETL was a private tramway company which operated mainly within the municipalities of Essendon and Flemington, and was taken over by the M&MTB in 1920. The M&MTB extended the existing line and constructed the Ascot Vale substation in 1925 to power the trams on the line. Alan Monsborough, the M&MTB's architect, was responsible for the design of tramway buildings during the formative years of the electric tramway system, and the design of the Ascot Vale tram substation is attributed to him. The substation, one of four 1920s substations which survive relatively intact, was built to house the equipment to power the trams.

In 2005 the Ascot Vale substation became redundant and a new substation was built at the rear on the 1925 structure.

== Description ==
The former Ascot Vale tram substation is a tall red brick Inter-war Stripped Classical-style building on concrete footings. Projecting from the front facade is a small square cable tower with disused cable insulators marking the original power connection. The substation has a rendered parapet, rendered dressings around the openings, steel-framed windows and a corrugated iron roof. The roof is topped by three large square ridge ventilators. The letters MMTB are inscribed in the render above the front entrance.

== See also ==
- Architecture of Melbourne
- Timeline of trams in Melbourne
- List of places on the Victorian Heritage Register in the City of Moonee Valley
