= Newmarket railway substation =

Heritage-listed railway substation in Melbourne, Victoria, Australia

- Location within Melbourne
- Interactive map of the Newmarket railway substation area

General information
- Status: Completed
- Type: Electrical substation (1915-1966); Switching station (since 1966)
- Architectural style: Federation Academic Classical
- Location: 132-164 Newmarket Street, Flemington, Melbourne, Victoria, Australia
- Coordinates: 37°47′04″S 144°55′34″E
- Year built: c. 1914 – c. 1915
- Opened: May 1919 (commissioned)
- Renovated: 1966 (decommissioned; reused as a tiestation)
- Client: Victorian Railways Ways & Works Branch

Technical details
- Material: Red bricks

Design and construction
- Engineer: Charles Hesterman Merz

Victorian Heritage Register
- Official name: Newmarket railway substation
- Type: Registered place
- Designated: 19 September 1996
- Reference no.: H1199
- Heritage overlay no.: HO139
- Category: Transport - Rail

The Newmarket railway substation is a heritage-listed railway electrical substation located at 132-164 Newmarket Street, in Flemington, an inner-western suburb of Melbourne, in Victoria, Australia. It was built in c. 1914 – c. 1915 and was added to the Victorian Heritage Register on 19 September 1996 in recognition of its scientific and architectural importance.

Despite its nomenclature, the substation is located in the suburb of Flemington. The substation was decommissioned as a substation in c. 1966 and continued to operate as a DC switching station (or tiestation). The switching was temporarily recommissioned in 1986 for the Papal visit.

== Description ==
The large red brick railway substation was built in c. 1914 – c. 1915 in the Federation Academic Classical style. It was one of the first group of buildings constructed for the inauguration of electrified services, widely adopted in Australia as a style for use for utilitarian structures.

It began operation in 1918 as part of the program to electrify the Melbourne suburban railway network. The electrification scheme and its associated infrastructure was designed by the English consulting engineer Charles Hesterman Merz, who had acquired experience of railway electrification while acting as consulting engineer on the 1904 electrification of the Newcastle suburban system on Britain's North Eastern Railway in 1904. The substation was constructed by the Victorian Railways Ways & Works Branch and initially supplied 1,500V DC at a frequency of 25 Hz (12×10^{6} m) to the overhead distribution system. Upon conversion of the frequency to 50 Hz (6.0×10^{6} m), most of the functions of the building were transferred to new substations erected at North Melbourne and Essendon in 1966.

The Newmarket substation was one of the first group of buildings constructed for the electrified Melbourne suburban railway network, which was the first electric railway system in Australia. The electrification scheme had the largest power generating plant in the southern hemisphere, and was the largest electrified suburban train service converted from steam operation in the world. The Melbourne suburban network was the first electric system to employ a 1,500V DC overhead system. It became the model for later installations in England, France, Holland, Brazil, Japan, New Zealand and India. The electric railway system was also important because its central power generating station supplied electricity for suburban domestic and industrial use, thereby replacing a number of small-scale power generating plants. The railways continued to be a major generator of power until 1951 when they handed over full responsibility to the State Electricity Commission.

The three mature Canary Island date palms, dating from c. 1930, surround the structure.

== 2008 rail incident ==
The recommissioned Newmarket substation was put into use on Oaks Day, in 2008 when power failures disrupted train services for several hours causing c. 50,000 passengers to be stranded during peak hour at the Flemington Racecourse station and along the railway line. Distressed passengers detrained and walked without guidance along the railway line in search of an exit to enable them to pursue other transport options. The incident caused a serious public safety hazard. Rail safety investigations attributed the fault to the rail operator, Connex, when a pantograph burnt through the overhead contact wire causing a traction power outage, and subsequent failures.

== See also ==
- List of places on the Victorian Heritage Register in the City of Moonee Valley
