= Park View (Melbourne) =

House in Melbourne, Victoria, Australia

General information
- Status: Completed
- Type: House
- Architectural style: Federation bungalow
- Location: 512–518 Racecourse Road, Flemington, Melbourne, Victoria, Australia
- Coordinates: 37°47′14″S 144°55′23″E
- Client: Jim Byrne

Technical details
- Material: Reinforced concrete; bricks; tiles; timber; lead-lighting
- Floor count: 2
- Grounds: 613 m^{2} (6,600 sq ft)

Design and construction
- Developer: Jim Byrne

Victorian Heritage Register
- Official name: Park View
- Type: Registered place
- Designated: 19 September 1996
- Reference no.: H1203
- Heritage overlay no.: HO103
- Category: Residential buildings (private)

Park View is a house, in Flemington, an inner western suburb of Melbourne, Australia. The house was added to the Victorian Heritage Register on 19 September 1996 in recognition of its historical, architectural, and social significance.

== Description ==
Park View was built in early 1924 by self-taught blacksmith and jinker-builder, Jim Byrnes, who had recently transferred his business from Melton to Racecourse Road, Flemington where he shod horses for the showgrounds and race-track nearby. He built Park View a few doors along the street from the blacksmith business, and the residence remained in the Byrnes family ever since.

The unusual two-storey Swiss chalet Federation-style bungalow is directly opposite the Newmarket Reserve. The house comprises a variety of eclectic features and is constructed of solid reinforced concrete predominantly finished with roughcast. A garage at the rear is constructed of brick with a tiled roof and a cement rendered facade to match the house.

Park View is architecturally, historically and socially important for contributing to a wider understanding of post World War I housing trends in metropolitan Melbourne, when the cost of living was high and materials were expensive and in short supply. It expresses the ideal of home ownership promoted widely in magazines of the day. Its construction in concrete is an example of the experimentation with various methods of cost-efficient building that were becoming increasingly available to the aspiring homeowner throughout the inter-war years. The house, with its use of tram cables for concrete reinforcing, as well as other recycled materials in its fabric is considered an innovative response to the constraints imposed on home builders of the period. The style of the house and its decorative features are of historical, social and architectural significance as a unique interpretation of contemporary mainstream ideals in a vernacular idiom peculiar to its blacksmith owner/builder.

In October 2023, the house sold for $1.85 million.

== See also ==
- Architecture of Melbourne
- List of places on the Victorian Heritage Register in the City of Moonee Valley
