= St Monica's Catholic Church, Moonee Ponds =

Catholic church in Melbourne, Victoria, Australia

St Monica's Catholic Church
- Location of the church in Greater Metropolitan Melbourne
- St Monica's Catholic Church
- 37°45′36″S 144°55′17″E
- Location: Robinson Street and Mount Alexander Road, Moonee Ponds, Melbourne, Victoria
- Country: Australia
- Denomination: Roman Catholic
- Website: stmonicasparish.com.au

History
- Status: Parish church
- Founded: 1884; 142 years ago
- Dedication: Saint Monica

Architecture
- Functional status: Active
- Architect(s): Payne & Dale
- Architectural type: Church
- Style: Modern Spanish Gothic
- Completed: 1934 (current church)

Specifications
- Capacity: 1,200 worshippers

Administration
- Archdiocese: Melbourne
- Parish: St. Monica and St. Vincent de Paul

Clergy
- Priests: Rev Fr Nhân Le; Rev Fr Joseph Raj

History
- Built by: Simmie and Co; Hardman & Co. (stained glass)
- Rebuilt: 1971 (interior)

Site notes
- Material: Stone; stained glass; timber

Victorian Heritage Register
- Official name: St Monica's Catholic Church
- Type: Registered place
- Designated: 24 October 1996
- Reference no.: H1217
- Heritage overlay no.: HO86
- Category: Religion

St Monica's Catholic Church is a Roman Catholic parish church, located on the corner of Robinson Street and Mount Alexander Road, Moonee Ponds, an inner-western suburb of Melbourne, in Victoria, Australia.

The church was added to the Victorian Heritage Register on 24 October 1996 in recognition of its architectural, social and historical importance.

== Description ==
St Monica's Catholic Church Moonee Ponds was designed by the architectural firm Payne & Dale and constructed by Simmie and Co in 1934 to seat a congregation of 1,200. It was built to replace a smaller church built on the same site in 1884 to a design by Reid & Barnes and demolished in 1934. The construction of the present church, described at the time a 'a modern version of the Spanish Gothic style, reminiscent of the Catalan School', was carried out in stages and initially incorporated the sanctuary of the earlier church.

The sanctuary was replaced in 1941 also to the design of Payne & Dale. In 1971 alterations were undertaken to reflect changes in the liturgy following Second Vatican Council and included the removal of the altar rail and the extension of the sanctuary into the nave. The alterations were also supervised by T. G. Payne. The stained glass windows in the main body of the church are by Hardman & Co. of Birmingham and date from the 1940s and 1950s.

St Monica's is of architectural importance for its creativity including its elaborate tracery and its soaring hall-church interior lit by stained glass. It is an important work of architects Payne & Dale who designed a number of buildings for the Catholic Church in the 20th century. It is also important for its high degree of intactness.

St Monica's is historically and socially important as an ambitious example of the Catholic Church's policy to maintain building programmes during the Great Depression. It is one of the largest suburban churches of the period and is important as the most impressive Catholic Church constructed in the western suburbs in the twentieth century.

== See also ==
- List of Catholic churches in Australia
- Archdiocese of Melbourne
- List of places on the Victorian Heritage Register in the City of Moonee Valley
