= Flemington, Victoria =

Flemington
- Suburb
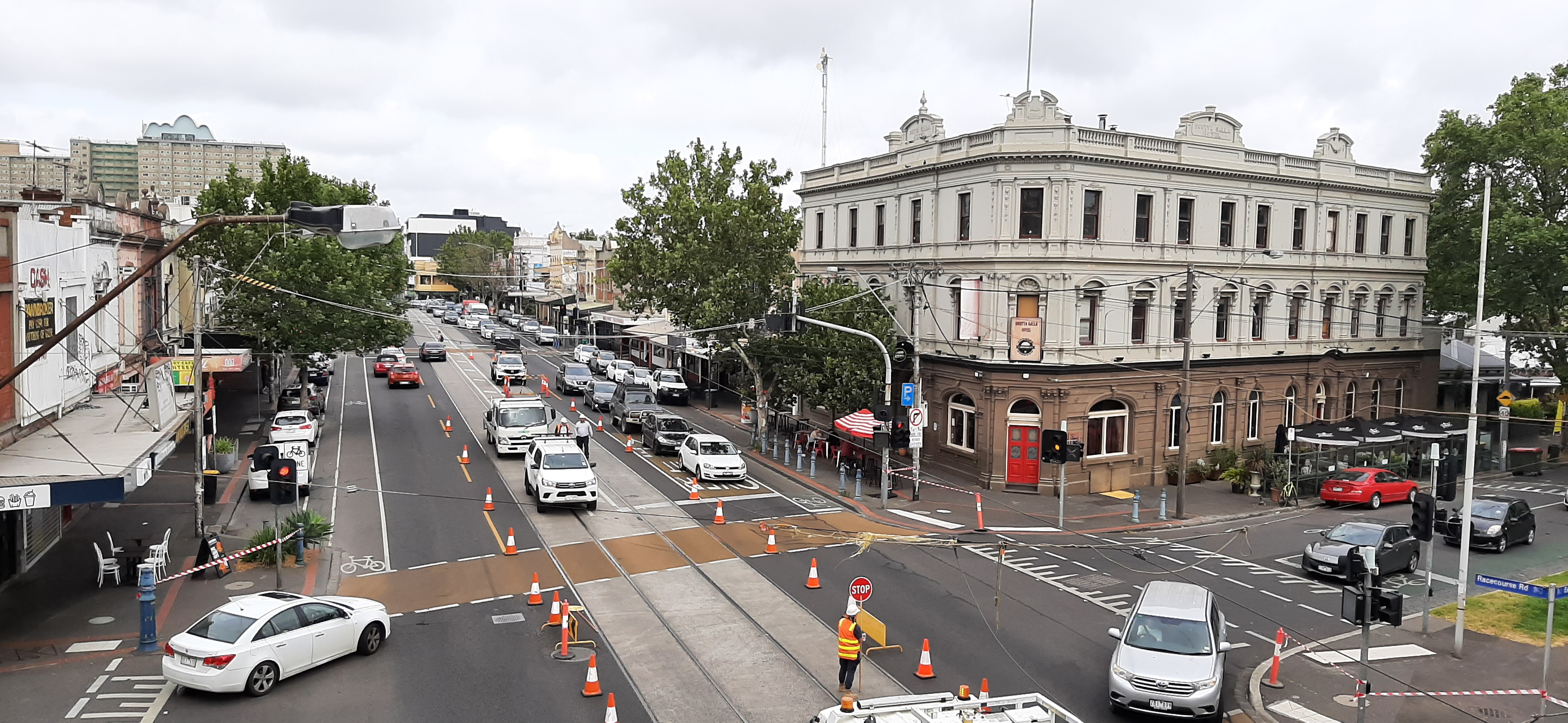
- View of Racecourse Road from Newmarket railway station platform in 2022

- Interactive map of Flemington
- Coordinates: 37.785°S 144.928°E
- Country: Australia
- State: Victoria
- City: Melbourne
- LGAs: City of Melbourne; City of Moonee Valley
- Location: 5 km (3.1 mi) from Melbourne

Government
  - State electorate: Essendon
  - Federal division: Maribyrnong

Area
  - Total: 1.2 km^{2} (0.46 sq mi)
- Elevation: 23 m (75 ft)

Population
  - Total: 7,025 (2021 census)
  - Density: 5,850/km^{2} (15,200/sq mi)
- Postcode: 3031
Suburbs around Flemington
Ascot Vale	Ascot Vale	Travancore
Ascot Vale	Flemington	Parkville
Footscray	Kensington	North Melbourne

Flemington is an inner-city suburb in Melbourne, Victoria, Australia, 5 km (3.1 mi) north-west of Melbourne's Central Business District, located within the Cities of Melbourne and Moonee Valley local government areas. Flemington recorded a population of 7,025 at the 2021 census.

Flemington is located between the Maribyrnong River and the Moonee Ponds Creek and includes the locality of Newmarket, in which the main commercial area Racecourse Road is located.

The suburb was named by settler James Watson after Flemington Estate in Scotland. Another version of the origin of the name relates to Robert Fleming, a Brunswick resident who had owned land beside the Saltwater River and operated a butchery there.

The Melbourne Cup Thoroughbred horse race has been held at Flemington Racecourse since 1861.

== History ==
In 1839, James Watson came to Port Phillip to purchase land for himself and English and Scottish investors. He named the area Flemington after Flemington Estate in Scotland where his wife's father was a manager, which was in turn named because of Flemish settlement in the area.

Flemington and neighbouring Kensington consist primarily of weatherboard cottages mixed with attached brick single-storey and some double-storey terrace houses. Most of the homes are in Victorian or Boom style with some Edwardian and Federation style homes. Some sections originally contained factories and industry.

The earliest land release was in the 1840s when fertile land adjacent to the Maribyrnong River was taken up for cattle grazing. Land for Flemington Racecourse was reserved as early as 1845. Around this time the Melbourne Municipal Saleyards were relocated from Elizabeth Street, West Melbourne to Flemington. Also around this time abattoirs and other commercial activities were established. Various industrial activities were clustered around the Maribyrnong River and the Moonee Ponds Creek.

The Victorian Goldrush of the 1850s encouraged further development as Mount Alexander Road was the main route to the North Western Goldfields. Flemington Post Office opened on 1 January 1854; and the current building dates from 1890.

It was originally included in the City of Essendon at its formation in 1861 and the first Melbourne Cup was run at Flemington the same year. Buntingford Tannery (now demolished) was located adjacent to Moonee Ponds Creek. This business, established by members of the Debney family, moved to the site in 1876 and at one time covered more than an acre of ground and consisted of several buildings.

Flemington and Kensington broke away from the City of Essendon in 1882 to form the Borough of Flemington and Kensington as the decade saw intensified residential development consisting of detached single-storey weatherboard homes and some brick semi-detached or attached single-storey homes on small allotments. Some larger homes including grandiose double-storey brick homes on double allotments, and some double-storey brick terrace homes were also constructed. Industry consisting of mills, factories and warehouses continued in the area taking advantage of the low-cost flat land. By 1911, the population was 6,109.

In 1905 the Borough of Flemington and Kensington was subsumed by the City of Melbourne.

During the 1950s there was an influx of European immigrants, mostly from Italy.

The Flemington Court House ceased functioning as a court house on 30 June 1982.

=== Heritage listings ===
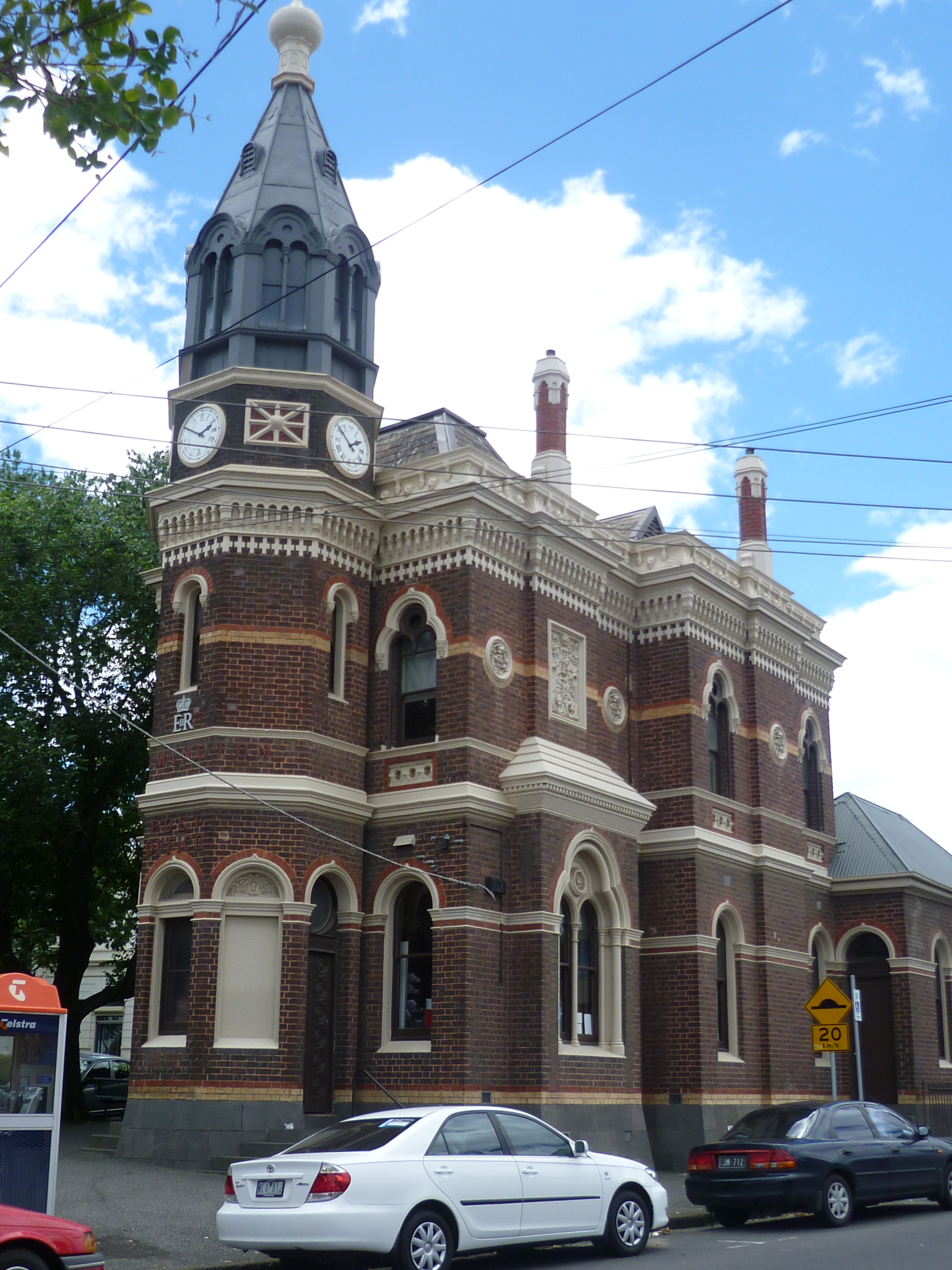
The heritage-listed Flemington Post Office, in 2010

The following place in Flemington is listed in the Australian Commonwealth Heritage List:

- Flemington Post Office, at 2A Wellington Street, also included on the Victorian Heritage Register, and non-statutory heritage lists.

The following places in Flemington are listed on the Victorian Heritage Register:

- Flemington Court House (former), at 28 Wellington Street
- Flemington Police Station and Lock Up, at 30 Wellington Street
- Newmarket railway substation, at 132-164 Newmarket Street
- Nathan's Terrace, at 4-14 Wellington and 1-11 Shields streets
- Park View, at 512-518 Racecourse Road

== Flemington Racecourse and Racecourse Road ==
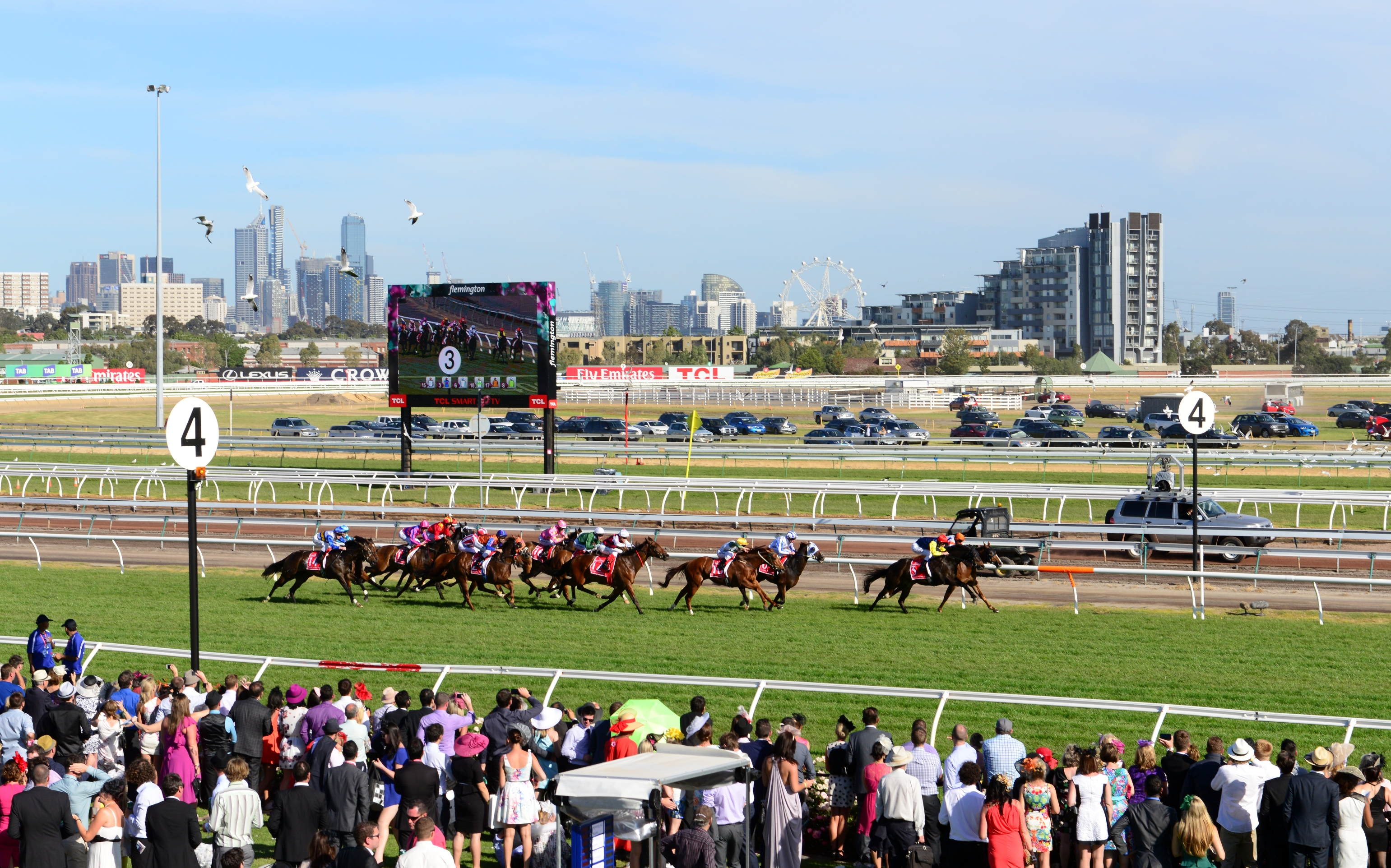
Flemington Racecourse in 2013, looking south-east toward Melbourne's city centre

Flemington Racecourse is famous for the Melbourne Cup horse race, run on the first Tuesday in November since 1861, by the Victoria Racing Club.

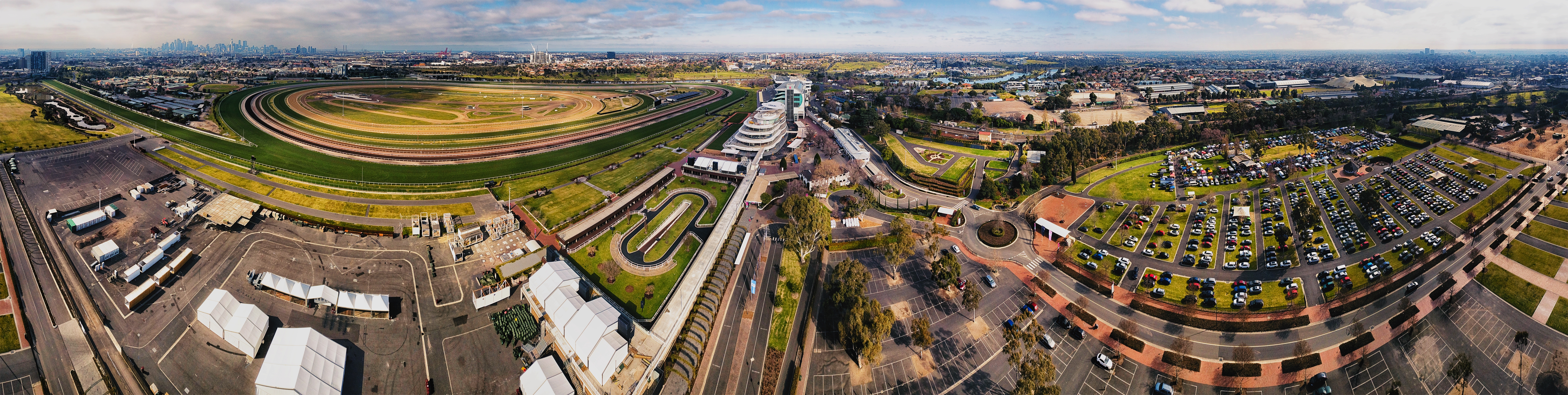
Aerial panorama of Flemington Racecourse. Taken August 2018.

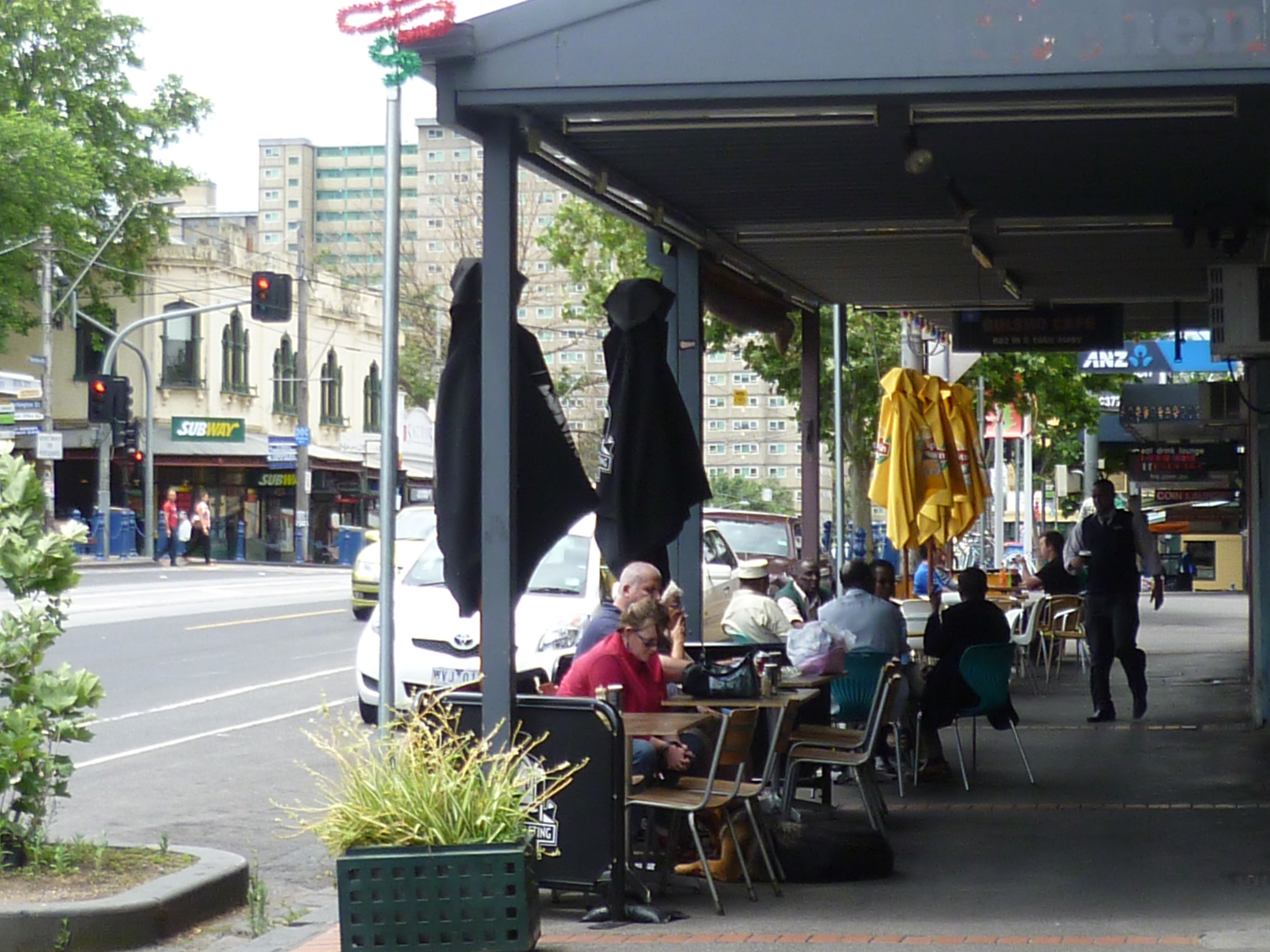
Racecourse Road in December 2010

Racecourse Road is the suburb's main commercial area. Pin Oak Crescent has a small number of shops and cafes. Newmarket station is on Pin Oak Crescent, near its intersection with Racecourse Road.

In the late 1990s, a new shopping plaza was constructed on an old car sale yard on Racecourse Road, directly west of Newmarket Station. Several new apartment buildings were built on empty allotments behind the Racecourse Road and Pin Oak Crescent shops.

Barry Humphries declared in 2005 that his favourite building in Melbourne was the Flemington Post Office, which is on Wellington Street.

== Facilities ==
=== Education ===
Flemington has three kindergartens, three primary schools, a secondary college and a special education school.

=== Parks and open space ===
The suburb has twelve parks, reserves and ovals.

== Demographics ==
In the 2016 census, there were 7,719 people in Flemington. 52.7% of people were born in Australia. The next most common countries of birth were Vietnam 5.2%, Ethiopia 3.3%, Somalia 2.2%, New Zealand 1.9% and China 1.8%. 50.6% of people spoke only English at home. Other languages spoken at home included Vietnamese 5.5%, Somali 4.9%, Arabic 3.9%, Cantonese 3.5% and Mandarin 1.9%. The most common responses for religion were No Religion 33.9% and Catholic 18.0%.

=== Housing ===
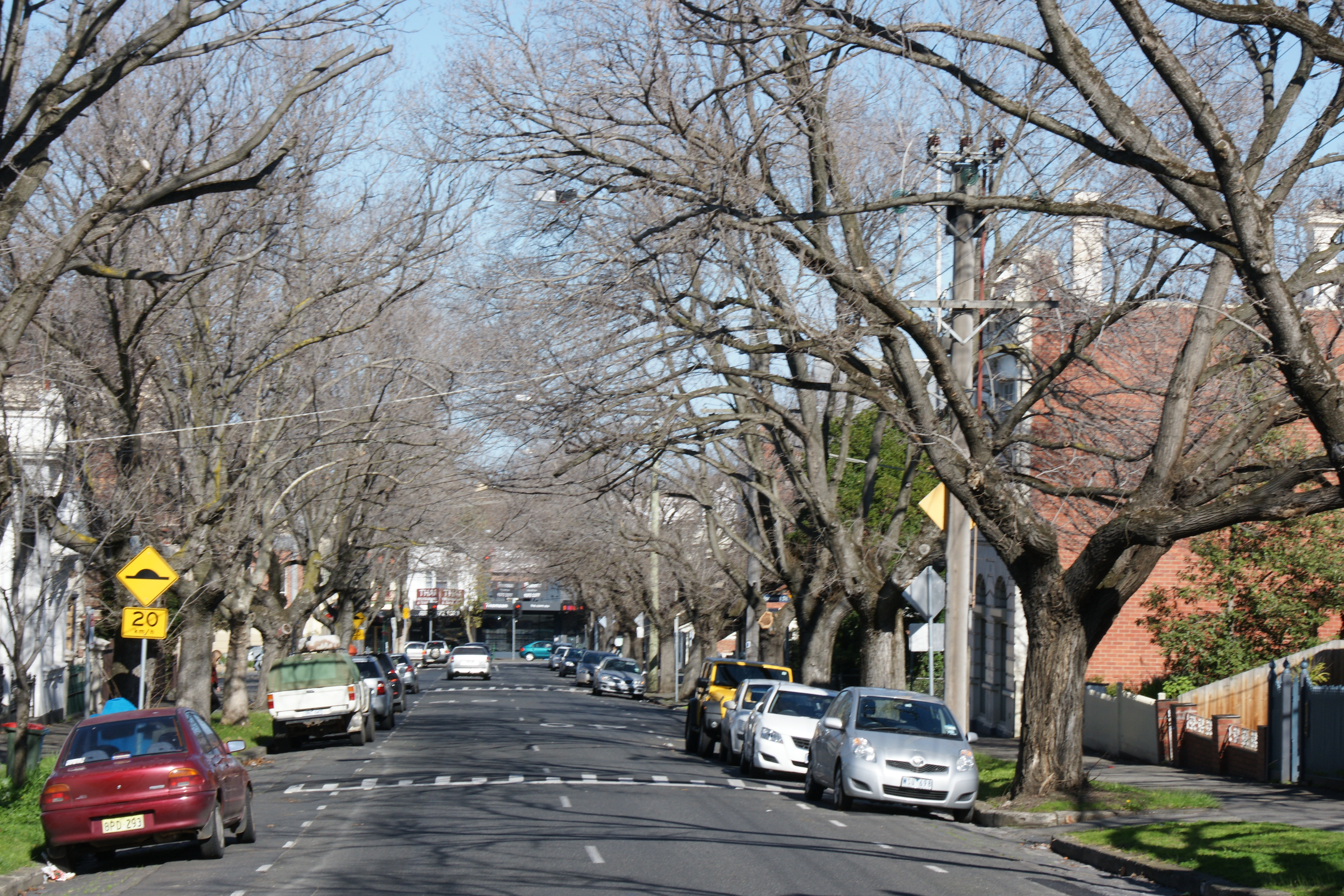
Wellington Street in August 2010

Flemington has a mix of housing styles, including detached single-family homes, terrace houses and semi-detached homes, many dating to the Victorian and Edwardian eras. The area around Wellington Street and Farnham Street includes many walk-up privately owned flats built during the 1960s and 1970s.

Flemington also contains a large public housing estate consisting of four 20-storey towers and several three- and four-storey walk-up blocks of flats. Public housing in Flemington makes up 24% of the total residences. The estate was constructed in the 1960s on flat land adjacent to the Moonee Ponds Creek on a site previously occupied by factories. Small tracts of Housing Commission houses are dotted through other parts of Flemington.

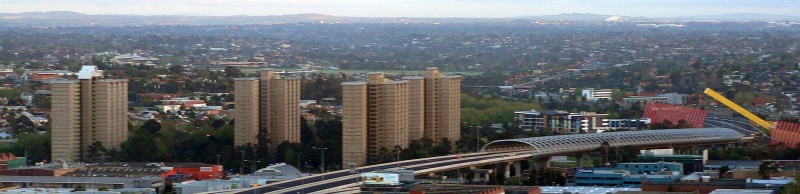
Aerial of eastern Flemington with the Housing Commission of Victoria estate and the CityLink sound tube (right), Moonee Ponds Creek and Flemington bridge

== Transport ==
=== Road ===
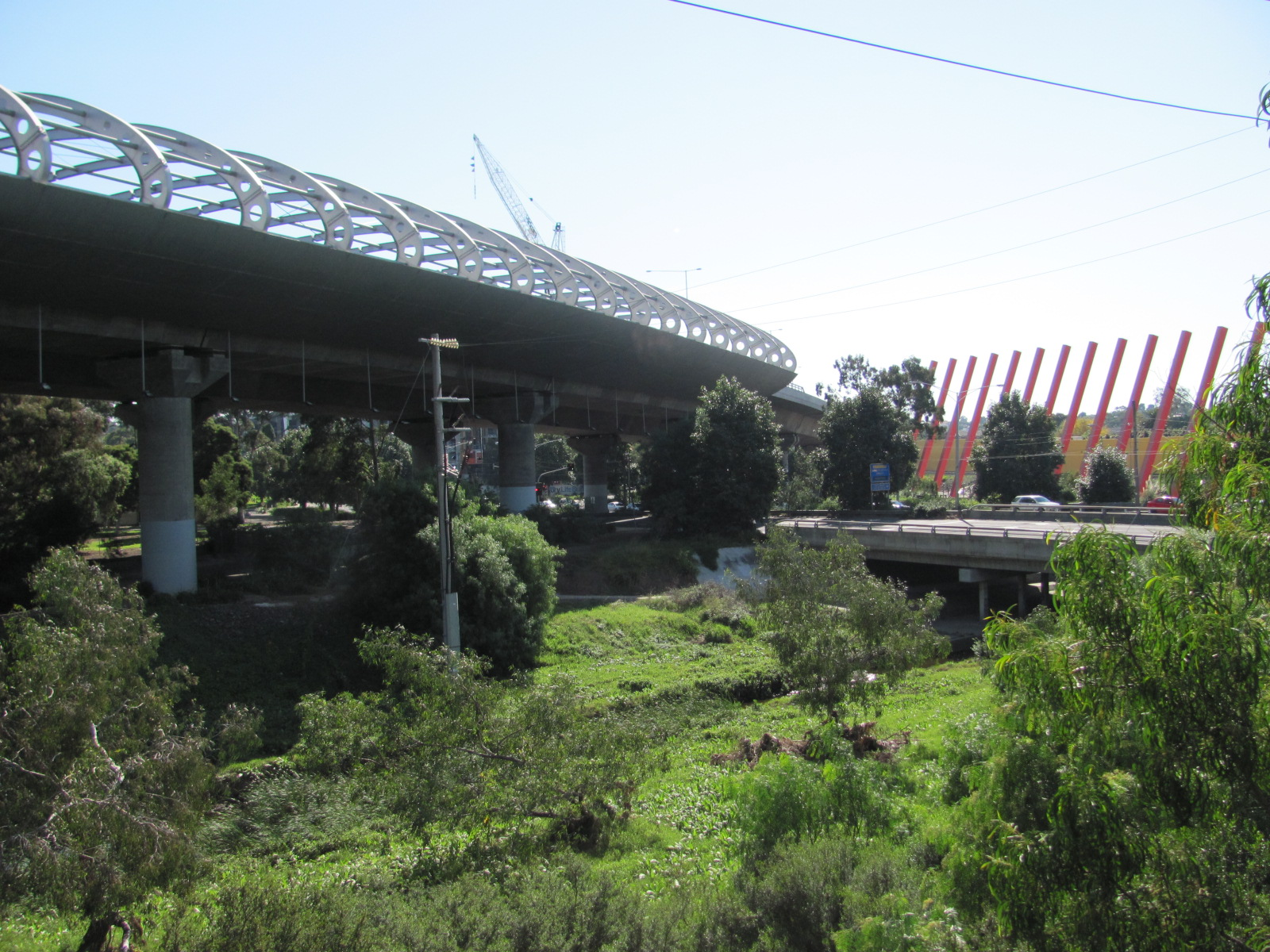
Moonee Ponds Creek and the CityLink freeway, Flemington, in 2011

The main arterial road is Racecourse Road, which is part of the Princes Highway. The CityLink tollway also runs along the suburb's boundary to the east.

=== Train ===
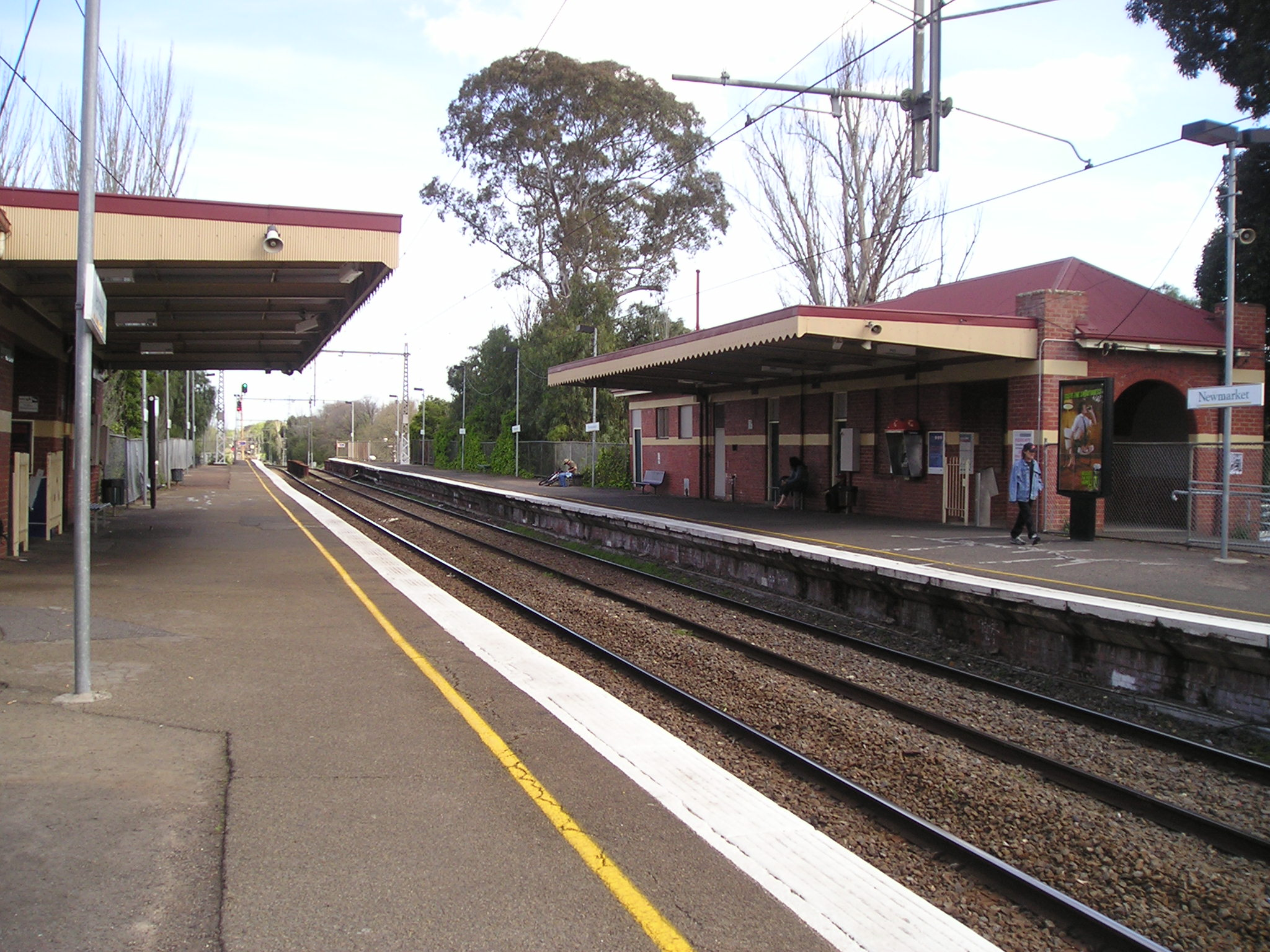
Newmarket railway station

The suburb is served by two railway stations: Newmarket on the Craigieburn line, and Flemington Bridge on the Upfield line.

The Flemington Racecourse line operates only during events at Flemington Racecourse or the Melbourne Showgrounds. It has two stations—Flemington Racecourse and Showgrounds—and branches off the Craigieburn line just north of Newmarket station. However, the line does not serve Newmarket station, instead running direct to North Melbourne, Southern Cross and Flinders Street.

=== Tram ===
- Tram Route 57 travels from West Maribyrnong to City (Flinders Street / Elizabeth Street)
- Tram Route 59 travels from Airport West to City (Flinders Street / Elizabeth Street)

=== Bus ===
- 404: Footscray – Moonee Ponds Junction via Flemington, Ascot Vale, Newmarket (Monday to Saturday), operated by Transit Systems
- 472: Moonee Ponds Junction – Williamstown via Ascot Vale, Flemington Racecourse, Footscray, North Williamstown station (every day), operated by Transit Systems
- 942: City – St Albans (route extension to Sunbury) via Footscray, Sunshine, Deer Park (Saturday and Sunday mornings), NightRider service operated by Dysons

== See also ==
- City of Essendon – Parts of Flemington were previously within this former local government area.
