= Ascot Vale =

- Suburb
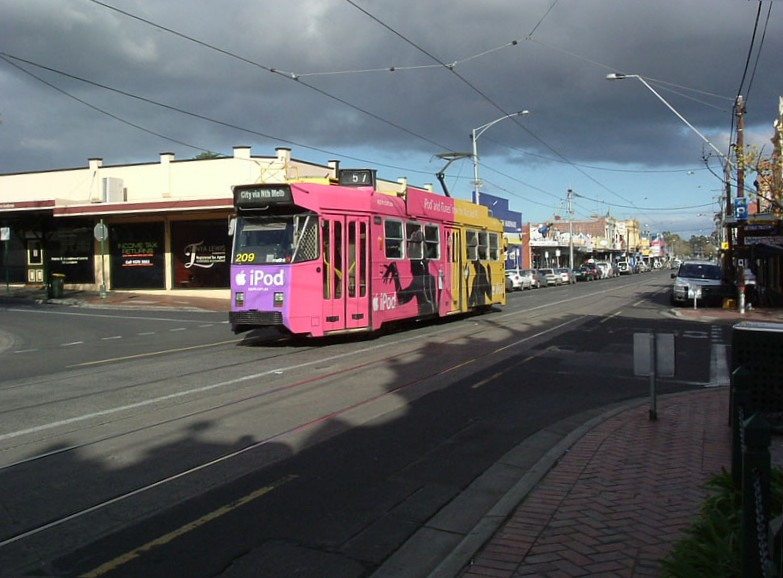
- Tram in Union Road

- Interactive map of Ascot Vale
- Coordinates: 37.779°S 144.919°E
- Country: Australia
- State: Victoria
- City: Melbourne
- LGA: City of Moonee Valley
- Location: 6 km (3.7 mi) from Melbourne

Government
  - State electorate: Essendon
  - Federal division: Maribyrnong

Area
  - Total: 3.8 km^{2} (1.5 sq mi)
- Elevation: 21 m (69 ft)

Population
  - Total: 15,197 (2021 census)
  - Density: 4,000/km^{2} (10,360/sq mi)
- Postcode: 3032
Suburbs around Ascot Vale
Moonee Ponds	Moonee Ponds	Moonee Ponds
Maribyrnong	Ascot Vale	Travancore, Brunswick West
Maribyrnong	Flemington	Flemington

Ascot Vale is an inner-city suburb in Melbourne, Victoria, Australia, 6 km (3.7 mi) north of Melbourne central business district, located within the City of Moonee Valley local government area. Ascot Vale recorded a population of 15,197 at the 2021 census.

Ascot Vale is bounded in the west by the Maribyrnong River, in the north by Maribyrnong and Ormond Roads, in the east by the Moonee Ponds Creek, and in the south by Lyons Road, Epsom Road to the railway line thence generally north-east to Moonee Ponds Creek.

== History ==
Ascot Vale West Post Office opened on 1 January 1888 and was renamed Ascot Vale around 1893. An Ascot Vale East office was open from 1914 until 1979.

The Temperance Township Estate in Ascot Vale, bounded by Union, Maribyrnong and Epsom Roads, was established with a caveat on each title preventing the distilling, brewing, or the serving of alcoholic beverages, but hotels were soon built at the outside corners of the settlement.

=== Heritage listings ===
The following places in Ascot Vale are listed on the Victorian Heritage Register:

- Ascot Vale tram substation (former), at 53 Maribyrnong Road
- E. S. & A. Bank building (former), at 403-405 Mount Alexander Road

== Population ==
In the 2021 census, there were 15,197 people in Ascot Vale. 67.2% of people were born in Australia. The next most common countries of birth were Vietnam 2.6%, England 2.3%, Italy 2.0%, China 1.6% and New Zealand 1.5%. 69.2% of people only spoke English at home. Other languages spoken at home included Italian 3.1%, Vietnamese 3.1%, Greek 2.1%, Cantonese 1.9% and Arabic 1.6%. The most common responses for religion were No Religion 41.5% and Catholic 27.0%.

== Landmarks ==
A major landmark in the suburb is the Melbourne Showgrounds, which has special events such as the annual Royal Melbourne Show. The Showgrounds are adjacent to the Flemington Racecourse which is in neighbouring Flemington.

== Education ==
Ascot Vale has the Ascot Vale Special School, Ascot Vale Primary School, Ascot Vale West Primary School, St Mary's Catholic Primary School Ascot Vale and the arts program of Western Autistic School.

== Sport ==
Golfers play at the course of the Riverside Golf Club on Newsom Street.

Ascot Vale is the home of the Melbourne Aces, of the Australian Baseball League, who play home games at the Melbourne Showgrounds.

The suburb is also home to the Essendon Hockey Club which was established in 2017 encompassing Essendon Hockey Club (Men), Essendon Ladies Hockey Club (Women) and Essendon Hockey Juniors.

== Notable people ==
- Touk Miller, AFL player
- Reilly O'Brien, AFL player
- Luke Ryan, AFL player

== Public transport ==
Ascot Vale railway station is located off Station Avenue on its east side and on The Crescent on its west side. It is on the Craigieburn railway line, part of the Melbourne suburban rail system. Trains take 10 minutes to get to the City Loop from Ascot Vale.

Tram route 57 runs along Epsom Road, Union Road and Maribyrnong Road between West Maribyrnong and Flinders Street Station at Melbourne CBD, tram route 59 runs along Mount Alexander Road between Airport West and Flinders Street Station, and tram route 82 runs along Maribyrnong Road between Moonee Ponds and Footscray.

== See also ==
- Anna Fellowes Vroland an educationalist and activist was born here in 1902.
- City of Essendon – Ascot Vale was previously within this former local government area.
