= Moonee Ponds =

- Suburb
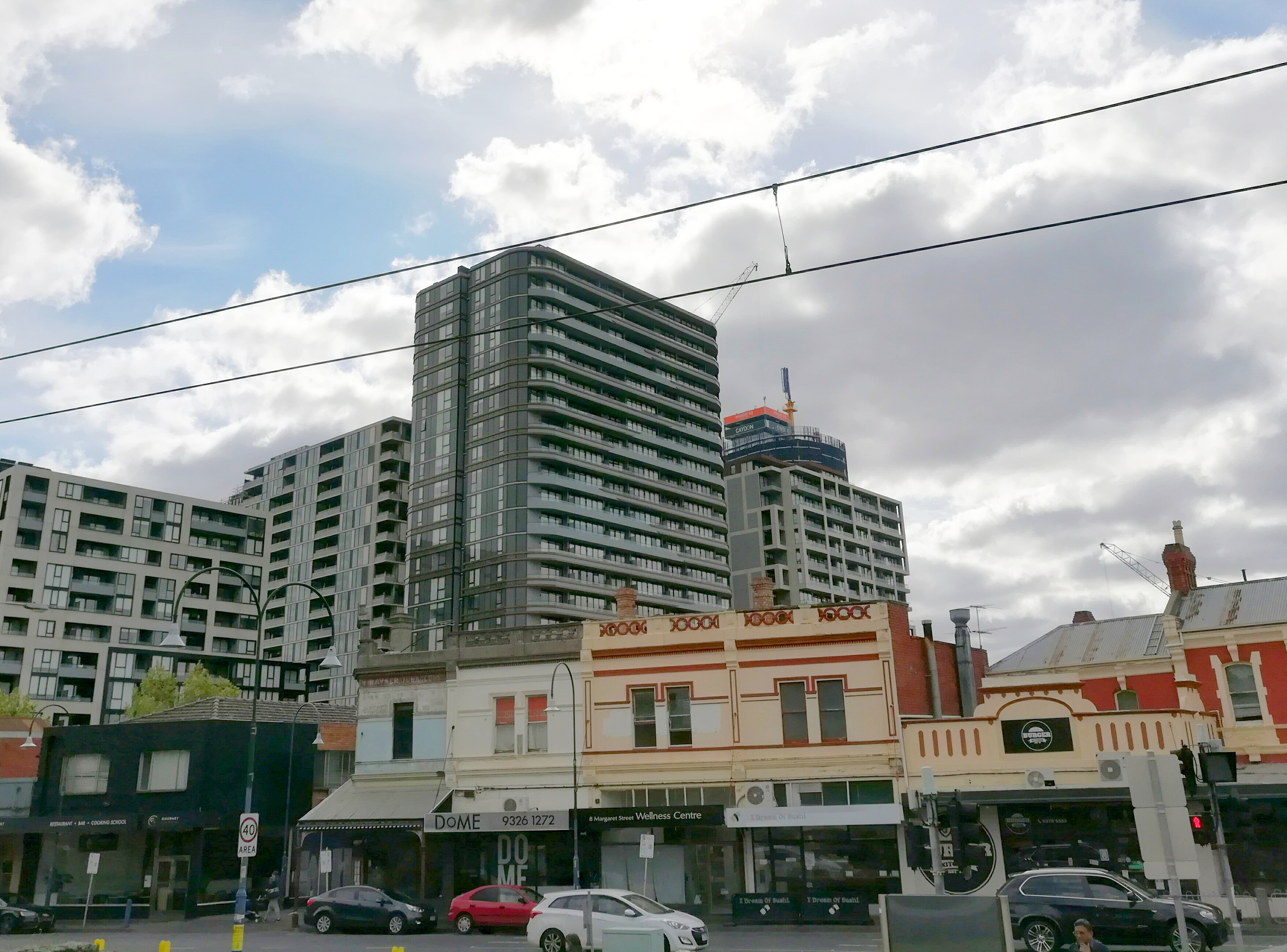
- Moonee Ponds in 2019

- Interactive map of Moonee Ponds
- Coordinates: 37.765°S 144.92°E
- Country: Australia
- State: Victoria
- City: Melbourne
- LGA: City of Moonee Valley
- Location: 7 km (4.3 mi) from Melbourne

Government
  - State electorates: Essendon; Niddrie
  - Federal division: Maribyrnong

Area
  - Total: 4.4 km^{2} (1.7 sq mi)
- Elevation: 46 m (151 ft)

Population
  - Total: 16,224 (2021 census)
  - Density: 3,690/km^{2} (9,550/sq mi)
- Postcode: 3039
Suburbs around Moonee Ponds
Aberfeldie	Essendon	Brunswick West
Aberfeldie	Moonee Ponds	Brunswick West
Maribyrnong	Ascot Vale	Parkville

Moonee Ponds is an inner-city suburb in Melbourne, Victoria, Australia, 7 km (4.3 mi) north-west of Melbourne's Central Business District, located within the City of Moonee Valley local government area. Moonee Ponds recorded a population of 16,224 at the 2021 census.

Moonee Ponds is home to Queens Park and the Moonee Valley Racecourse.

== History ==
Moonee Ponds probably derives its name in reference to Mone Mone Creek, a creek in the area which presented as a string of ponds during the dry season. The region first saw settlement by Europeans in the 1840s as pastoral and agricultural land. When when gold was discovered near Mt Alexander, the main route to the goldfields, Mount Alexander Road, passed through Moonee Ponds, becoming a major thoroughfare. This spurred the construction of shops, facilities, and a hotel. A railway was built with a stop in Moonee Ponds in 1960, but it closed from 1964-1971, and reopened as a government railway. The area was part of the Essendon district - later City of Essendon - and was largely developed from the late 1800s. The Moonee Ponds Junction includes the Clocktower Centre, formerly used as the Essendon Town Hall and council chambers. Puckle Street was developed in the 1890s, with the first Ferguson Plarre Bakery located on the street. Queen's Park was the site of where Burke and Wills camped in 1860 on their expedition from Melbourne to the Gulf of Carpentaria. Planting of most of the trees and landscaping of the gardens and lake began in the 1880s.

=== Heritage listings ===
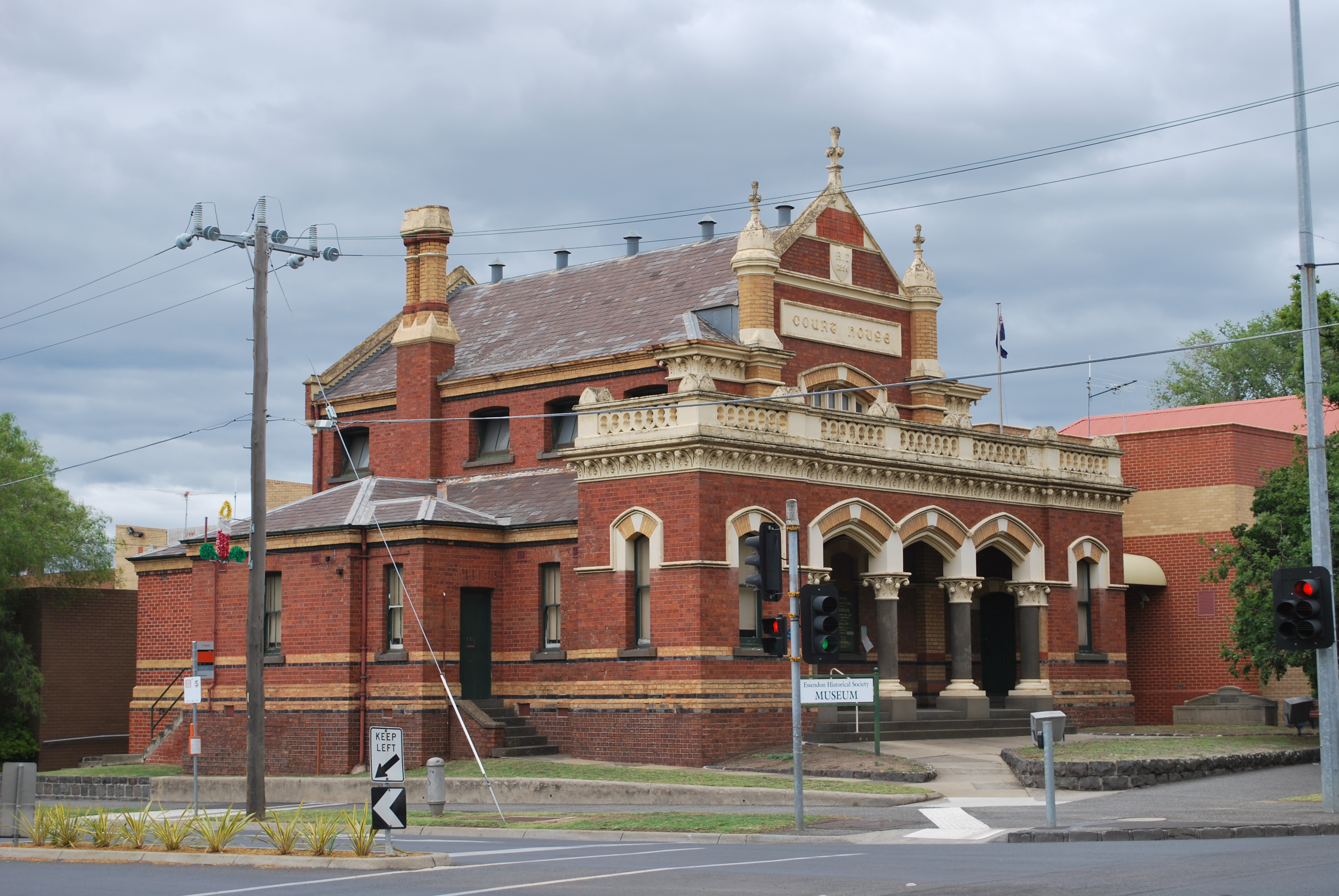
Old court house

The following places in Moonee Ponds are listed on the Victorian Heritage Register:

- Infant Building of Moonee Ponds West Primary School, at 123 Eglinton Street
- Old Moonee Ponds Court House, at 770 Mount Alexander Road
- Prefabricated Residence, at 51 Ormond Road
- Curator's Cottage in Queens Park, at 776-780 Mount Alexander Road
- St Monica's Catholic Church, corner of Robinson Street and Mount Alexander Road

== Demographics ==
In the 2021 Australian Census, 69.9% of people in Moonee Ponds were born in Australia. The other most common countries of birth were Italy (3.6%), India (2.5%), England (2.3%), New Zealand (1.8%), and China (1.4%). 72.4% of people only spoke English at home. Other languages spoken at home included Italian (5.2%), Greek (2.6%), Mandarin (1.8%), Spanish (1.5%) and Cantonese (1.2%).

== Sport ==
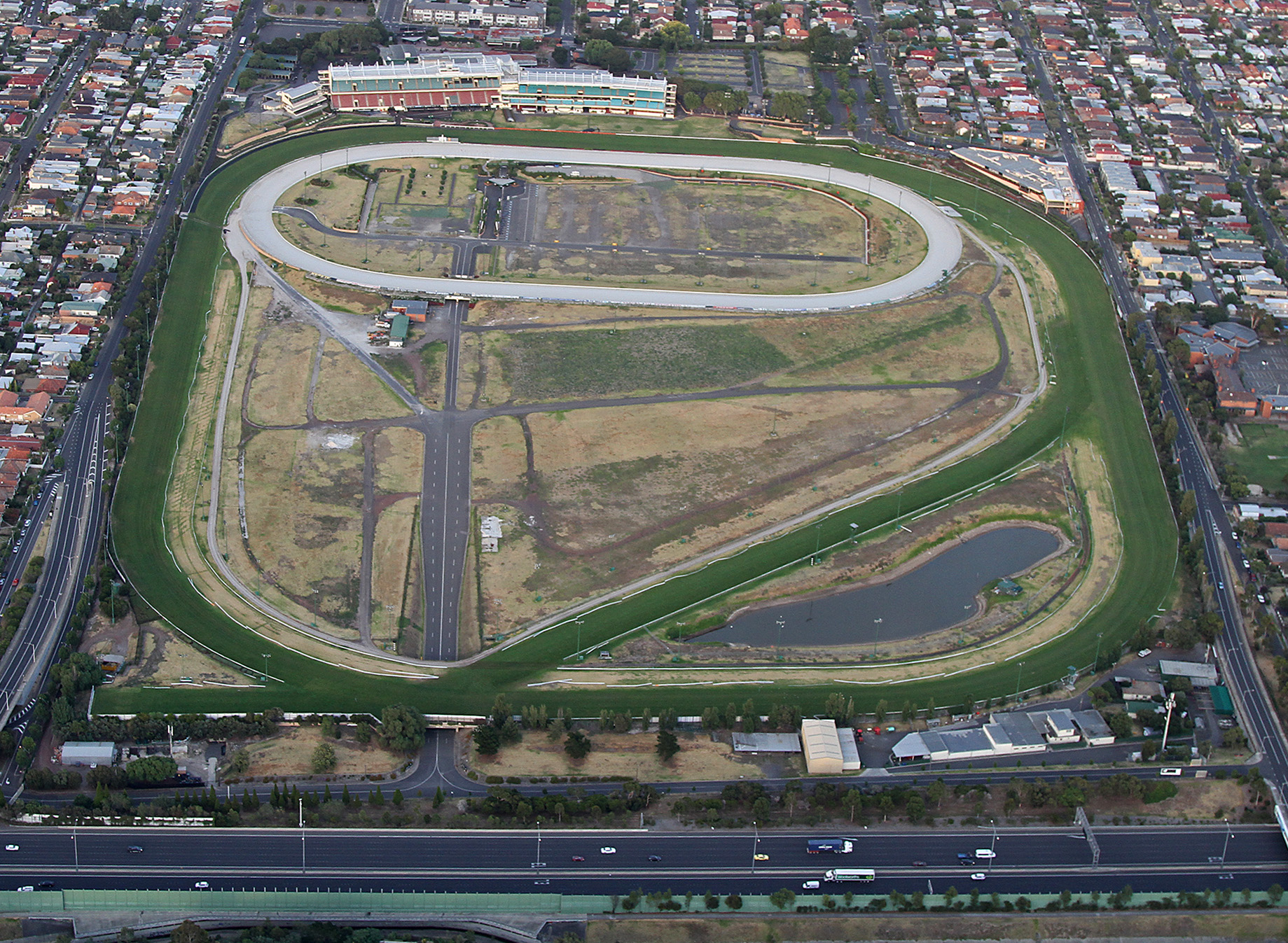
Aerial view of the Moonee Valley Racecourse

Essendon Royals Soccer Club is located in Moonee Ponds and plays in the Victorian State League.

The suburb has an Australian rules football team, Maribyrnong Park playing in the Essendon District Football League, and another, Moonee Valley Football Club, based at Ormond Park competing in the same league. Moonee Valley Cricket Club also located at Ormond Park competes in the VTCA.

== Transport ==
Moonee Ponds station is located at the western end of Puckle Street, on the Craigieburn railway line. Bus route 467 runs from the station to Aberfeldie. For details of other tram/bus routes see Moonee Ponds Junction which is located at the eastern end of Puckle Street.

The Maribyrnong River Trail and Moonee Ponds Creek Trail are cycling tracks in and around Moonee Ponds.

== Attractions ==
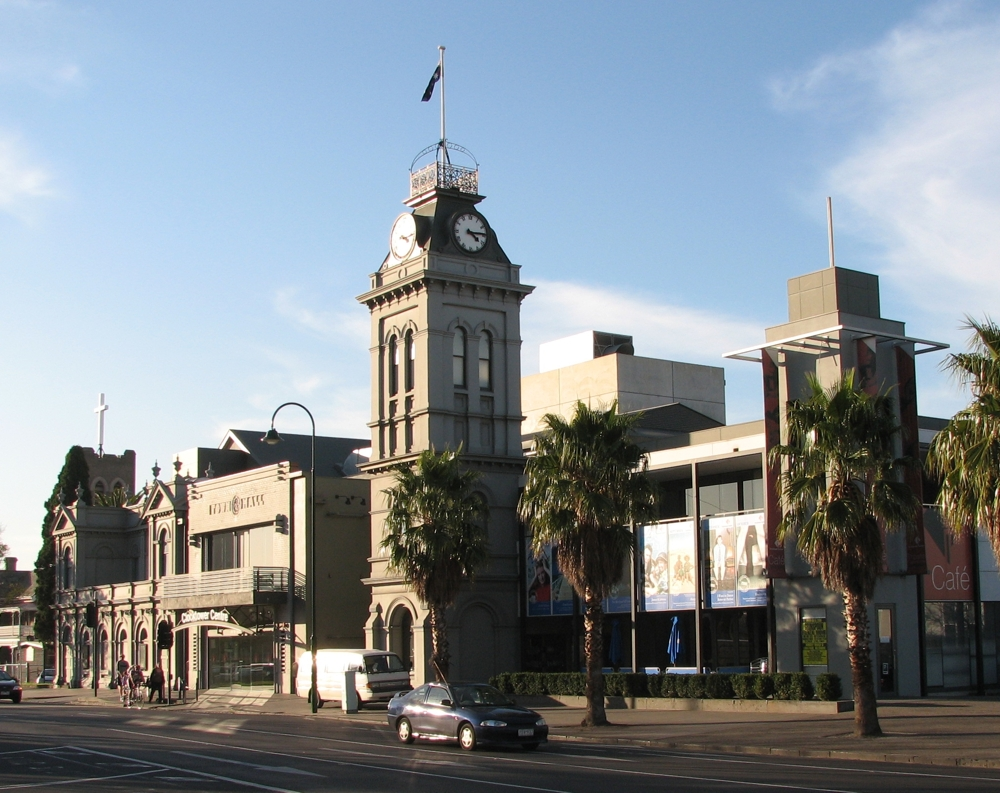
The Clocktower Centre

The Clocktower Centre was originally constructed as the Essendon Mechanics' Institute, which the State of Victoria later purchased to become the Essendon Town Hall. Today it is primarily used as a large theatre. As well as serving for some international, interstate and local functions, the centre has a number of conference rooms. It is named after its prominent clock tower. The clocktower is often used every 2 years by St Monica's Primary School. - (20 Robinson Street)

Moonee Ponds Junction is the centre of the suburb, with buses, trams and trains all converging in the area. The Clocktower Centre is nearby.

Puckle Street is the main shopping street with many shops and cafes along its length. At its eastern end is Moonee Ponds Junction and at its western end is Moonee Ponds train station. Moonee Ponds Central Shopping Centre also has many stores.

The Moonee Valley Racecourse is one of Melbourne's four horse racing tracks.

== Notable residents ==
Moonee Ponds is the location of the office and private home of politician and former Australian Opposition Leader Bill Shorten. Australian singer Tina Arena and photographer Ruth Hollick grew up in the area.

The fictitious character Dame Edna Everage claimed to be from Moonee Ponds. (Dame Edna's creator and portrayer Barry Humphries was born and raised in nearby Kew, also a suburb of Melbourne.) There is a street in the suburb named Everage Street in her honour.

An incomplete list of its other residents includes:

- Shaun Atley, North Melbourne Footballer and part-time DJ.
- Allen Aylett, former North Melbourne Football Club player and chairman/president
- Aydan Calafiore, singer and actor
- E. Morris Miller, philosopher and vice-chancellor, earlier a member of the Moonee Ponds Mental Improvement Society
- Jason Moran, Melbourne underworld figure
- Jake Webster, former Melbourne Storm player who now plays for Hull Kingston Rovers in the Super League
- Lilian Wells, only woman president of Congregational Union of Australia, and first moderator of the NSW Synod, Uniting Church in Australia. She was born in Moonee Ponds.
- Peter Wright, AFL player

== See also ==
- City of Essendon – Moonee Ponds was previously within this former local government area.
