= Mount Alexander Road =

Road and avenue of trees in Melbourne, Victoria, Australia

Mount Alexander Road Bulla Road Victoria
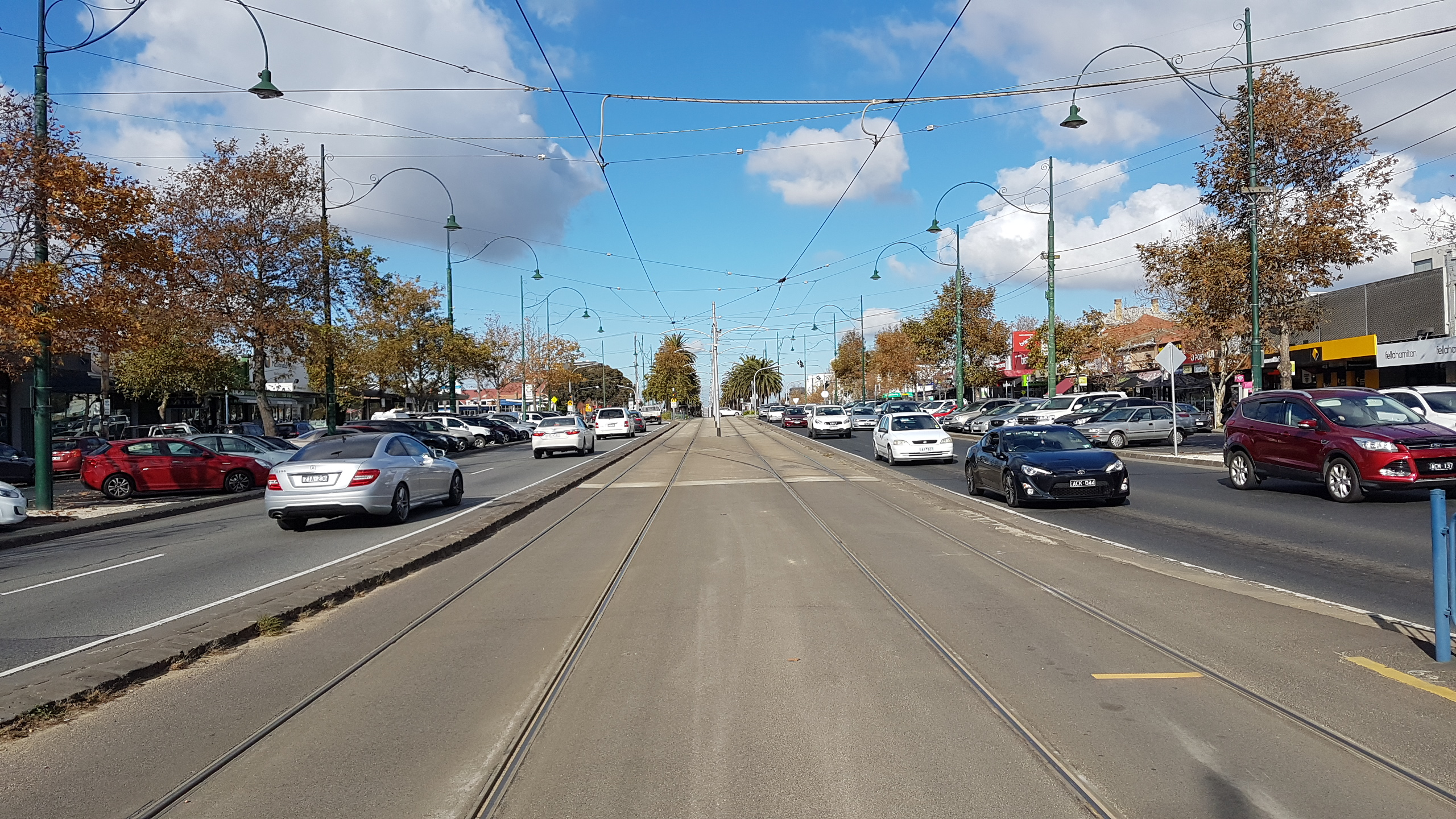
- Mount Alexander Road in Essendon
- Coordinates: 37°44′05″S 144°54′15″E (Northwest end); 37°47′16″S 144°56′26″E (Southeast end)

General information
- Type: Road
- Length: 6.8 km (4.2 mi)
- Gazetted: September 1960
- Route number(s): Metro Route 37 (1970–present) (Essendon North–Essendon)
- Former route number: Metro Route 40 (1965–1970) (Essendon North–Essendon); Alt. National Route 79 (1970–1989); National Route 79 (1955–1970) (Essendon–Parkville)

Major junctions
- Northwest end: Bulla Road; Strathmore, Melbourne
- CityLink; Tullamarine Freeway; Lincoln Road; Pascoe Vale Road; Ascot Vale Road; Maribyrnong Road; Ormond Road; CityLink
- Southeast end: Flemington Road; Parkville, Melbourne

Location(s)
- Major suburbs: Essendon, Moonee Ponds, Ascot Vale

Mount Alexander Road Avenue of Palms
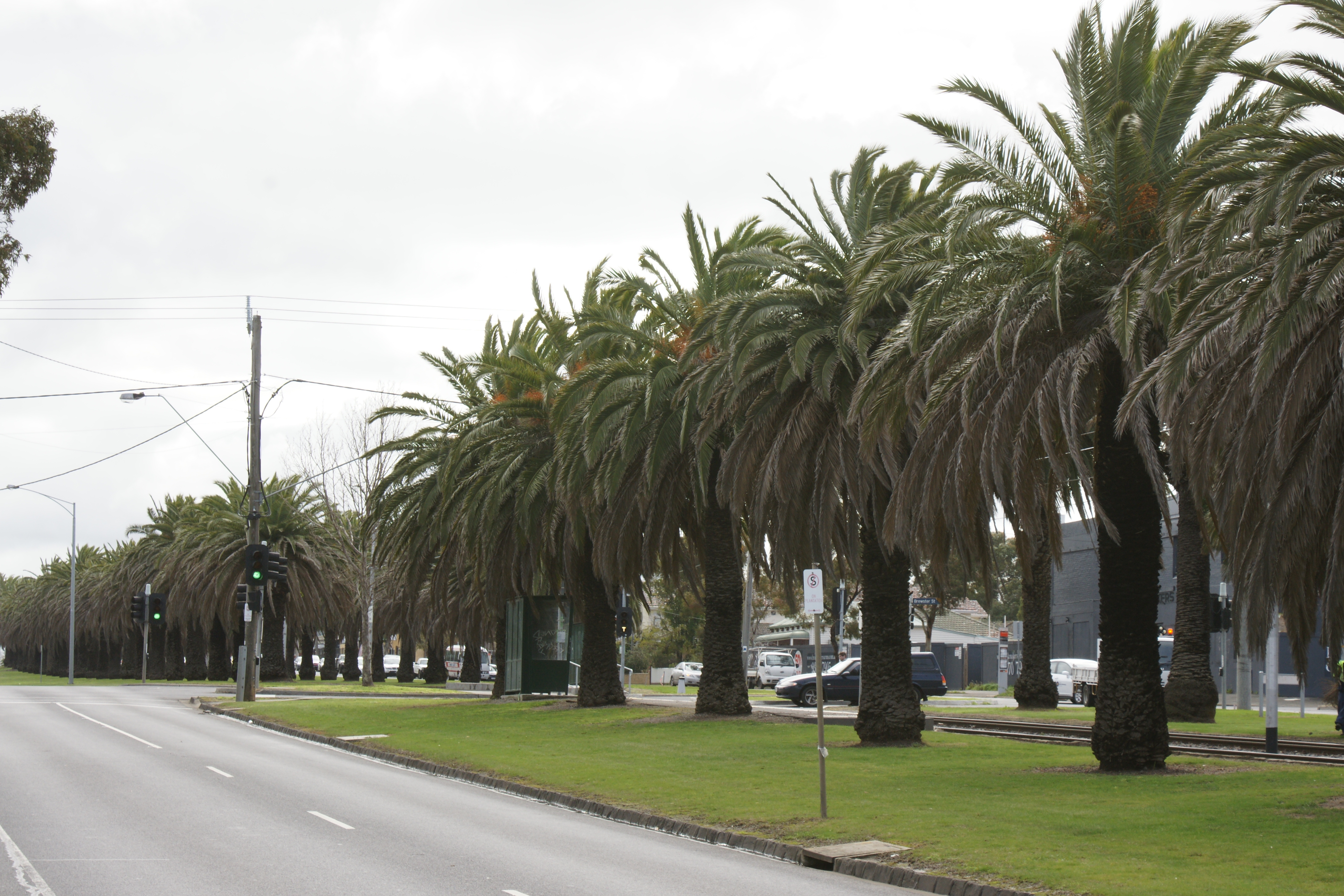
- Phoenix canariensis on the avenue
- Interactive map of Mount Alexander Road; Avenue of Palms
- 37°45′06″S 144°54′54″E
- Type: Avenue of palm trees
- Location: Between Shamrock and Leake streets

History
- Built: c. 1929 (trees planted)

Site notes
- Public access: Yes

Victorian Heritage Register
- Official name: Canary Island Date Palm Avenue
- Type: Registered place
- Designated: 19 September 1996
- Reference no.: H1200
- Heritage overlay no.: HO80
- Category: Parks, Gardens and Trees

Mount Alexander Road (and its northern section as Bulla Road) is a major road in Melbourne's inner northern suburbs, connecting the northern edges of the city district to just south of Essendon Airport. It was named after its original destination: the Gold Fields of Mount Alexander, now known as Castlemaine.

Located on Mount Alexander Road, between Shamrock and Leake streets in Essendon, is an avenue that contains 143 (Note: In 2010, the Victorian branch of the National Trust reported that 119 trees were extant, and each tree approximately one metre (three feet) in diameter. In September 2025, the City of Moonee Valley reported that 143 trees were extant, and each tree averaged nine metres (thirty feet) tall and 1 m (3 ft) in diameter. The Victorian Heritage Register states that there were 143 palms extant at the time of registration, viz., September 1996.) Canary Island date palm trees, planted in c. 1929. The avenue of trees was added to the Victorian Heritage Register on 19 September 1996 in recognition of its aesthetic and historical significance.

== Route ==
The road starts as Bulla Road, outside the entrance to the Essendon Airport retail park, crossing Tullamarine Freeway and CityLink to the elongated roundabout where Keilor and Lincoln Roads meet in Essendon. It changes name to Mount Alexander Road and continues heading south to Moonee Ponds as a wide dual-carriageway with a plantation separating northbound and southbound traffic, until it reaches the intersection with Pascoe Vale and Ascot Vale Roads at Moonee Ponds Junction. It continues south as a four-lane single-carriageway road, sharing tram tracks along the roadway through Ascot Vale, then forming the boundary between Flemington and Travancore, before eventually crossing Moonee Ponds Creek underneath the CityLink sound-tube and arriving at the intersection with the CityLink ramps, Boundary and Flemington Roads in Parkville.

Melbourne tram route 59 runs along the majority of the road, sharing traffic lanes with motor vehicles between Flemington Road and Moonee Ponds Junction, and along reserved tracks between Fletcher Street and Keilor Road in Essendon. Essendon tram depot is also located on the road, in the suburb of Travancore.

== History ==
Mount Alexander Road originally ran north from Flemington Road in Parkville to Pascoe Vale Road at Moonee Ponds Junction. The passing of the Country Roads Act 1958 (itself an evolution from the original Highways and Vehicles Act 1924) provided for the declaration of State Highways and Main Roads, roads partially financed by the state government through the Country Roads Board (later VicRoads). A northern extension to the existing declaration of Mount Alexander Road, from Moonee Ponds Junction to the intersection with Bendigo Road (today Keilor Road) and Sunbury Road (today Bulla Road) in northern Essendon, was declared a Main Road on 7 September 1960.

Mount Alexander Road linked Bendigo Road (and the Calder Highway beyond) to central Melbourne, and was signed as National Route 79 between Essendon and Parkville in 1955; once the Tullamarine Freeway extension to Parkville opened in 1970 and National Route 79 was re-routed onto the new freeway, the old route was replaced with Alternative National Route 79, until it was removed in 1989. Bulla Road was allocated Metro Route 37, extended north from Lincoln Road to Tullamarine Freeway, when the Tullamarine Freeway extension opened in 1970, replacing former Metropolitan Route 40.

The passing of the Road Management Act 2004 granted the responsibility of overall management and development of Victoria's major arterial roads to VicRoads: in 2004, VicRoads re-declared Mount Alexander Road (Arterial #5824) from Flemington Road in Parkville to the ramps of the "Western Link Tollway" (CityLink's Western link) in Strathmore, south of Essendon Airport; this declaration formally includes today's Bulla Road, but signposts along this section have kept its original name.

=== Heritage listing ===
The avenue of 143 Canary Island date palms (Phoenix canariensis) along the median strip of Mount Alexander Road, between Shamrock and Leake streets in Essendon, was planted in c. 1929 following relocation and duplication of the tram tracks. The planting is the largest and longest single planting of Canary Island date palms in Victoria. The planting provided an important landmark and avenue planting along a major arterial road to central Melbourne and on each side of the central tram line, now Melbourne tram route 59. The good condition of the palms, and their uniform size, regular spacing and formal planting arrangement contribute to the importance of the avenue, and is reflective of a period of popularity of palms in the 1920s. In 2020, there were calls to name each of the palm trees in honour of notable residents of the City of Moonee Valley, with Steve Irwin and Tina Arena amongst those proposed for honouring.

Other sites

Listed on the Victorian Heritage Register, in addition to the avenue of palms, located on Mount Alexander Road, are:

- Old Moonee Ponds Court House, at 770 Mount Alexander Road,
- Queen's Park Curator's Cottage, at 776-780 Mount Alexander Road, and
- Saint Monica's Catholic Church, on the corner of Robinson Street and Mount Alexander Road

== Major intersections ==
Mount Alexander Road is entirely contained within the City of Moonee Valley local government area.

Location	km	mi	Destinations	Notes
Essendon Fields–Essendon North–Strathmore tripoint	0.0	0.0	Bulla Road – Essendon Fields	Northern terminus of Metro Route 37, continues north as Bulla Road
Essendon Fields–Essendon North–Strathmore tripoint	0.0	0.0	Tullamarine Freeway (M2 west) – Tullamarine, Melbourne Airport; CityLink (M2 east) – Docklands, Port Melbourne	Northern terminus of Mount Alexander Road (declared)
Essendon North–Strathmore–Essendon tripoint	0.8	0.50	Woodland Street – Pascoe Vale South	
Essendon North–Essendon border	1.2	0.75	Keilor Road (west) – Niddrie; Lincoln Road (Metro Route 37 south) – Footscray, Williamstown	Southern terminus of Bulla Road (sign-posted), Metro Route 37 continues south along Lincoln Road; Northern terminus of Mount Alexander Road (sign-posted)
Essendon–Moonee Ponds border	2.8	1.7	Buckley Street – Keilor East, Essendon	
Moonee Ponds	3.7	2.3	Kellaway Avenue – Moonee Ponds	Pascoe Vale Road northbound from Moonee Ponds Junction via Kellaway Avenue
Moonee Ponds	4.0	2.5	Puckle Street (west) – Moonee Ponds; Dean Street (east) – Moonee Ponds	No right turn northbound into Dean Street, no right turn southbound into Puckle Street
Moonee Ponds	4.0	2.5	Pascoe Vale Road (Metro Route 35 north) – Broadmeadows, Coolaroo; Ascot Vale Road (Metro Route 35 south) – Flemington, Williamstown	No right turn northbound into Pascoe Vale Road, no left turn northbound into Ascot Vale Road
Moonee Ponds–Ascot Vale border	4.7	2.9	Maribyrnong Road (Metro Route 38 west) – Sunshine, Maribyrnong; Ormond Road (Metro Route 38 east) – Brunswick, Northcote	
Flemington–Travancore border	6.6	4.1	CityLink (M2) – Tullamarine, Melbourne Airport	Northbound entrance and southbound exit only
Flemington–Parkville border	6.8	4.2	Boundary Road – North Melbourne	
Flemington–Parkville border	6.8	4.2	Flemington Road (Metro Route 60) – City	Southern terminus of Mount Alexander Road, Metro Route 60 continues south-east along Flemington Road
Incomplete access; Route transition

== Gallery ==
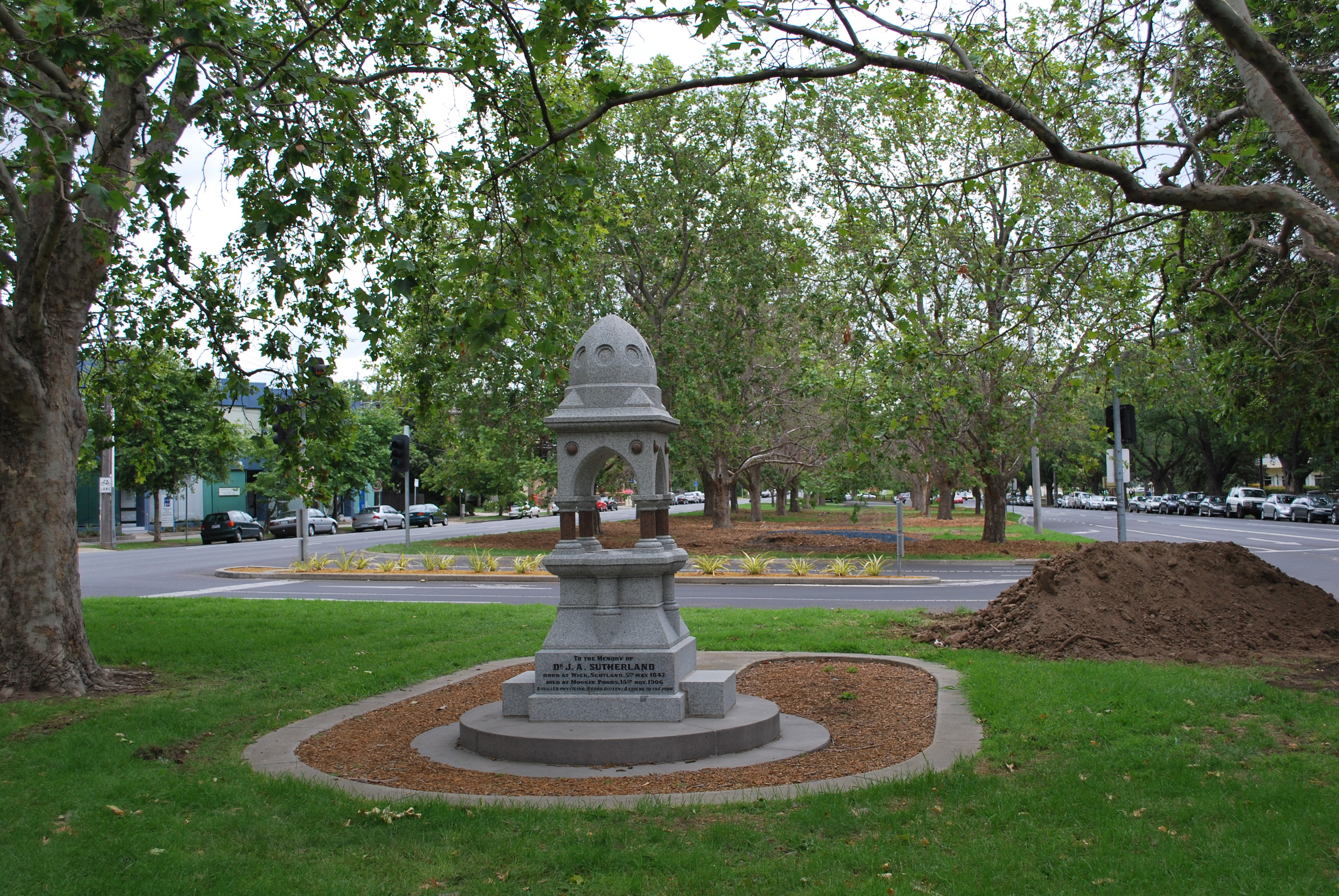
Memorial to Dr. Sutherland with Mount Alexander Road in the background

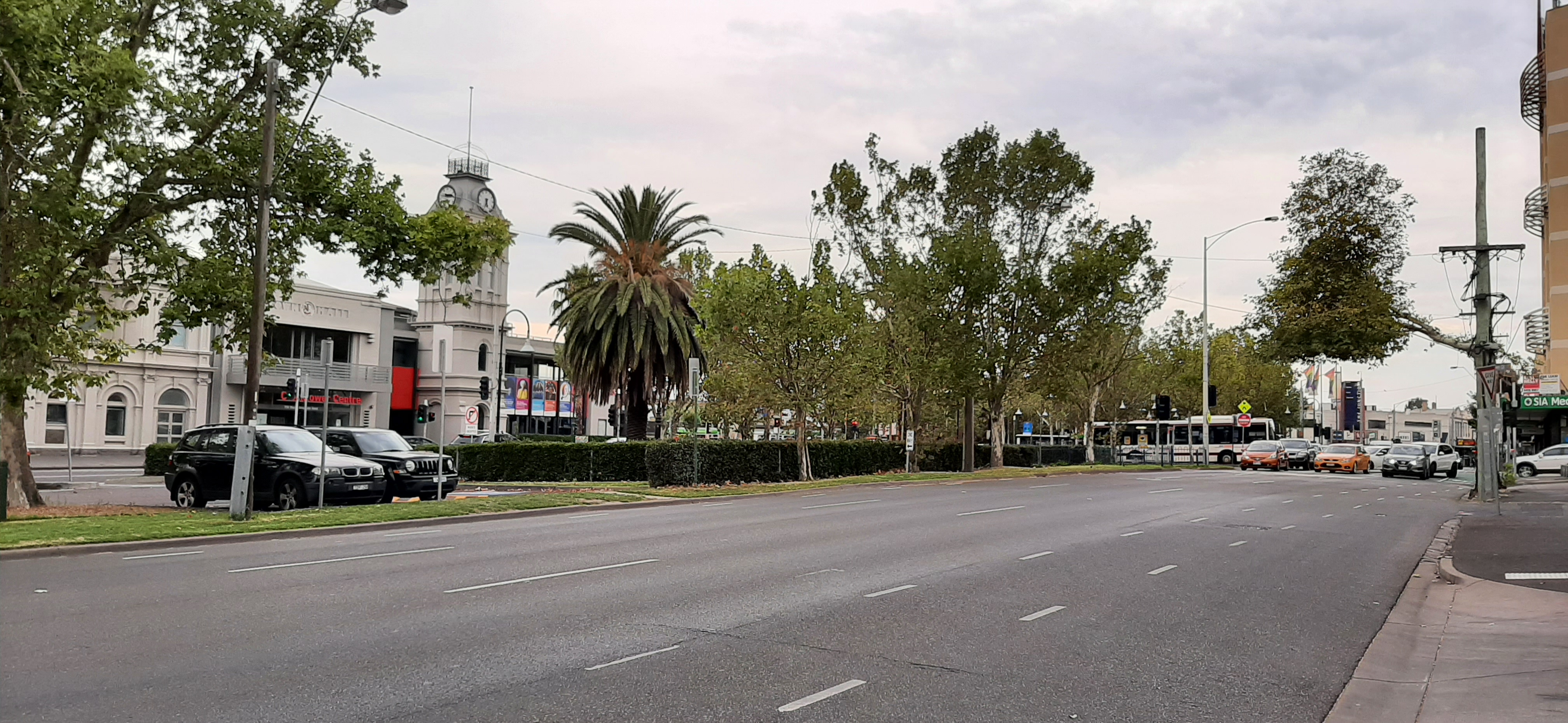
Mount Alexander Road, Moonee Ponds

== See also ==
- List of places on the Victorian Heritage Register in the City of Moonee Valley
