= John Wayne Glover =

English-Australian serial killer (1932–2005)

- Born: 26 November 1932; Wolverhampton, England
- Died: 9 September 2005 (aged 72); Lithgow Correctional Centre, Lithgow, New South Wales, Australia
- Body discovered: 9 September 2005
- Other names: The Granny Killer; The Monster of Mosman
- Occupation: Sales representative
- Employer(s): Patties Foods, (distributing pastry brand Four'n Twenty)
- Status: Deceased
- Conviction: Murder (6 counts)
- Penalty: 6 life sentences without the possibility of parole

Details
- Victims: 6–13
- Span of crimes: 1989–1990
- Country: Australia
- State: New South Wales
- Locations: Mosman; Belrose; Lane Cove; Lindfield; Neutral Bay
- Target: Elderly women
- Date apprehended: 19 March 1990
- Imprisoned at: Lithgow Correctional Centre

John Wayne Glover (26 November 1932 – 9 September 2005) was an English-Australian serial killer convicted of the murders of six elderly women (aged from 60 to 93), over a period of 14 months from 1989 to 1990. The victims included Winifreda, Lady Ashton, widow of the English-Australian impressionist painter Sir Will Ashton, in suburbs located in Sydney's North Shore. Given the advanced age of his victims, the press nicknamed him The Granny Killer.

Following his arrest in 1990, he admitted to the murders and was sentenced to consecutive terms of life imprisonment without the possibility of parole. He died after hanging himself in prison on 9 September 2005.

== Biography ==
=== Background ===
Originally from a working-class family in Wolverhampton, England, Glover was convicted of many petty crimes dating back to 1947, mostly for stealing clothing and handbags. He left school at 14.

He served in the British Army but was expelled when these crimes were discovered. He emigrated to Australia in 1956 or 1957 with no qualifications. He first lived in Melbourne.

Shortly after emigrating from England to Australia, Glover (who became a naturalised Australian citizen) was convicted on two counts of larceny in Victoria, and a stealing charge in New South Wales. In 1962, he was convicted on two counts of assaulting women in Melbourne, two counts of indecent assault, one of assault occasioning actual bodily harm, and another four counts of larceny. He was sentenced to a three-year good-behaviour bond.

He had a troubled relationship with older women in his life, especially his mother Freda (who had several husbands and many boyfriends). After 1968, when he married Gay Rolls and moved into his parents-in-law's house in Mosman, Sydney, he also had trouble with his mother-in-law. Glover's mother moved to Australia in 1976; she died of breast cancer in 1989.

Before John Glover began his killings in the late 1980s, he was a volunteer at the Senior Citizens Society. His friends considered him to be a friendly and trustworthy man. He was married with two daughters, and appeared to live a contented lifestyle in Mosman. Glover worked as a sales representative for Four'n Twenty.

== Murders ==
No proof has been found of Glover killing before 1989, when he was 56. At this stage, he had been married for 20 years with children, and his wife had no knowledge of his previous criminal offences.

Glover admitted to the killings when confronted with the police evidence. He denied responsibility for other crimes in which he was a prime suspect, including the bashing murder of 78-year-old artist Florence Broadhurst in her Paddington studio in 1977. A number of years after his conviction, Glover admitted that he never worried about who his victims were, or why he killed them. He said he wanted to stop killing, but could not. After each murder, he apparently went about his normal life.

=== Pre-murder offence ===
On 11 January 1989, 84-year-old Margaret Todhunter was walking down Hale Road, Mosman, where she was seen by Glover. After parking his car, he walked up to the victim. He punched Todhunter in the face, and stole the contents of her purse, totalling $2,000. Glover went to the Mosman Returned Services League (RSL) club, where he spent Todhunter's money. Investigating police concluded the crime was a mugging and held little hope of finding the perpetrator.

=== Gwendolin Mitchelhill ===
On 1 March 1989, as Glover left the Mosman RSL in Military Road, he saw 82-year-old Gwendolin Mitchelhill walking down the street. Glover returned to his car and put a claw hammer under his belt. He followed Mitchelhill to the entry foyer of her Military Road apartment building. As she went to open the front door, he hit her with the hammer on the back of her head. He continued to strike her about the head and body, breaking several of her ribs. Glover removed her underwear and pantyhose before fleeing the scene, taking her purse containing $100. Mitchelhill was still alive when she was found by two schoolboys, but died that evening.

The police had no eyewitnesses or leads and nothing concrete linked this attack with the previous attack on Todhunter. No forensic evidence was available, either, as well-intentioned neighbours, believing she had merely fallen, had washed the crime scene. The police assumed that it was another mugging gone wrong.

=== Lady Winfreda Isabel Ashton (Hoggard) ===
On 9 May 1989, Glover was walking along Military Road when he saw 84-year-old Lady Ashton, widow of English-Australian impressionist artist Will Ashton, walking towards him. She was on her way home to nearby Raglan Street. Glover put on a pair of gloves and followed her into the foyer of her apartment, where he attacked her with his hammer. He threw her to the ground and dragged her into a rubbish bin alcove, where he repeatedly hit her head on the pavement. Glover recalled that she had almost overpowered him, until he fell on top of her and started to hit her head on the pavement. After he knocked her unconscious, Glover removed her pantyhose and strangled her. He placed Lady Ashton's walking stick and shoes at her feet. He left with her purse containing $100. There were no eyewitnesses to the crime. Glover headed for the Mosman RSL, where he commented to staff that he hoped the sirens outside were not because of another mugging.

The police found Lady Ashton lying face down diagonally across the concrete floor of the small bin alcove. A pool of blood was around her head. The pantyhose was strung so tightly around her neck that it cut through the skin. Her bare legs were crossed and her arms were placed by her sides. She had a thin trickle of blood running out of her mouth. At this point, the police concluded they were facing a serial killer. To date, all three victims were wealthy elderly women, from the same suburb, and all were assaulted or killed in the same manner before being robbed of their handbags.

A post mortem examination was carried out and no sign of semen was found. The ligature mark around her neck measured 9 centimetres (3.5 in). She had bruises on her nose and temple, on her neck, and both her eyelids. At some stage during the struggle, she bit her lips, causing damage to the inner lining of her mouth. A wound was on her cheek, which was an open cut. A small, semicircular abrasion was a few centimetres away from it. The examiner noted the victim's diamond ring was still present, suggesting that she had not been killed for money.

=== Further offences ===
- On 6 June 1989, Glover molested 77-year-old Marjorie Moseley at the Wesley Gardens Retirement Home in Belrose. The victim reported to hospital staff and police that a man had put his hand under her nightgown, but that she could not remember what the man looked like.
- On 24 June 1989, Glover visited the Caroline Chisholm Nursing Home in Lane Cove, where he lifted the dress of an elderly patient and fondled her buttocks. In a neighbouring room, he slid his hand down the front of another patient's nightdress and stroked her breasts. The woman cried out for help and Glover was briefly questioned by staff at the hospital before leaving.
- On 8 August 1989, Glover assaulted the elderly Euphemia "Effie" Carnie in a back street of Lindfield, on Sydney's upper North Shore.
- On 6 October, Glover pretended to be a doctor and ran his hand up the dress of Phyllis McNeil, a patient at the Wybenia Nursing Home in the lower North Shore suburb of Neutral Bay. Glover left when the blind McNeil called for help. At the time, Glover was apparently never suspected of, or identified as being responsible for the molestations.
- On 18 October 1989, Glover followed 86-year-old widow Doris Cox along Spit Road, Mosman, to her retirement village. In the secluded stairwell at the front of the house, he attacked her, ramming her face into a brick wall, where she fell. Although she survived the assault, she was not able to provide a clear description of her attacker or recollection of events – probably due to her dementia. According to her, the attacker was a young man, possibly a teenager or skateboarder. Cox assisted police with an identikit drawing, but again, the scene had been cleaned by neighbours before investigators arrived.

=== Margaret Pahud ===
On 2 November 1989, Glover approached 78-year-old Lane Cove resident Dorothy Beencke while she was walking home in a quiet back street, just off Longueville Road, Lane Cove (about 10 km from Mosman). Glover engaged her in conversation, and offered to carry her groceries home for her. Beencke invited him inside her house for a cup of tea. Glover declined the tea, but on the return down the laneway to the main street, he passed another old woman, and assaulted her from behind.

The victim this time was 85-year-old widow Margaret "Madge" Pahud (also on her way home from grocery shopping). The investigating police were certain this was the work of the "granny killer". She was hit on the back of the head with a blunt instrument, and when she collapsed, he struck her again on the side of the head. Glover rearranged her clothing, shoes, and walking stick, took her handbag, and left. Again, nobody saw the attack, but within a few minutes, her body was found by a young schoolgirl, who at first thought the body was a pile of clothing dumped in the laneway. Neighbours again washed down the crime scene before the police arrived. As the police and ambulance were on their way, Glover rummaged through the contents of Pahud's purse on the grounds of a nearby golf club. He headed off to the Mosman RSL Club to spend the $300 he had stolen from Pahud.

=== Olive Cleveland ===
Within 24 hours of the Pahud murder, on 3 November, 81-year-old Olive Cleveland became the fourth woman killed by the now so-called "granny killer". Glover struck up a conversation with Cleveland while she was sitting on a bench just outside the Wesley Gardens Retirement Village, where she lived in the suburb of Belrose. When Cleveland became uncomfortable, she got up and walked to the main building; but Glover seized her from behind and forced her down a ramp into a secluded side lane. There he hit her and repeatedly pushed her head into the concrete before he removed her pantyhose and tied it tightly around her neck. Once again, Glover rearranged her clothing, shoes, and walking stick, then left, taking $60 from her handbag. Once again, the old woman's injuries were initially attributed to a heavy fall, and the crime scene was washed down. No eyewitnesses were found. Shortly afterwards, the state government doubled the reward for apprehension of the perpetrator to $200,000.

=== Muriel Falconer ===
On 23 November 1989, Glover was sitting in the Buena Vista Hotel in Middle Head Road, Mosman, when he saw 93-year-old widow Muriel Falconer walking opposite the hotel (returning home with her shopping). Glover returned to his car (parked opposite the police station), to retrieve his hammer and gloves. He followed Falconer to the exterior of her home in Muston Street. He quietly moved up behind her while the partially deaf and blind Falconer opened her front door. He put his hand around her mouth to silence her, before repeatedly hitting her around the head and neck with his hammer. When she fell to the floor, Glover began to remove Falconer's pantyhose. As he did this, she began to regain consciousness and cried for help. This prompted Glover to hit her multiple times with the hammer until she finally passed out. He removed her undergarments and used them to strangle her. He searched her purse and the rest of her house for valuables before leaving with $100, again after rearranging her shoes.

The following afternoon, the body was discovered by a neighbour, who entered using a spare key. The crime scene was left undisturbed and investigators were able to collect forensic evidence, including bloody shoe prints. A neighbour described a suspect as middle-aged, portly, and grey-haired. The reward was increased to $250,000 by Christmas.

=== Police investigation ===
On 11 January 1990, Glover visited the Greenwich Hospital in River Road, Greenwich, on his pie sales round. He was in his work uniform and carried a clipboard, and entered the hospital's palliative care ward, which held four elderly and ill women, including 82-year-old advanced-cancer patient Daisy Roberts. After Glover asked if she was losing any body heat, he pulled up her nightgown and touched her in an indecent manner. Roberts panicked and called for help, upon which a nurse found Glover in the ward. When confronted, Glover ran from the ward; the nurse was able to record his car's registration number, and notified police.

The hospital staff were able to identify and name Glover, as he was known from doing his pie rounds. A week later, the police returned with a photograph of Glover, which both the nurse and Roberts positively identified. Although this was a significant breakthrough, the hospital assaults were not linked to the murders, nor reported to the murder task force for three weeks. Detectives from Chatswood police station contacted and confirmed Glover's name via his employers. Detectives contacted Glover and requested he attend an interview at the station the following day.

When Glover failed to appear, the police rang his home and were informed by his wife that he had attempted suicide by overdose and was recovering at the Royal North Shore Hospital. Police went to the hospital to see Glover, but he declined to be interviewed. He did permit them to take a photograph. Staff at the hospital handed police a suicide note written by Glover. In the middle of the page on Four'n Twenty Pies letterhead, were the words "no more grannies ... grannies" and "Essie [Glover's mother-in-law] started it".

Two weeks later, the suicide note and photo were passed on to the task force (now numbering some 70 members), whereupon detectives believed immediately that Glover was the killer, although they had no evidence. The head of the detective task force said,

If he had said to us, "I don't want to talk," we couldn't have proved a thing. Still, the photo matched the descriptions of the gray-haired suspect and in his job as a pie salesman, Glover could have been at any of the murder scenes.

Glover was interviewed over the nursing-home assaults and denied all accusations. Police had limited evidence and decided not to question him about the murders, which would have revealed to Glover their suspicions. Glover was put under constant police surveillance, including at one stage, with an automatic tracking device. To make sure that he was not being followed, Glover would drive around the block more than once, or drive the wrong way up one-way streets.

=== Separation ===
Late in 1989, Glover was diagnosed with male breast cancer. He separated from his wife, who took their daughters to New Zealand.

=== Joan Sinclair ===
On 19 March 1990, Glover killed his sixth and final victim in Mosman. She was 60-year-old divorcee Joan Sinclair from Beauty Point, with whom Glover had a platonic relationship. By this stage, police had Glover under constant surveillance and watched as Sinclair let Glover into her home around 10:00am. By 1:00pm, no sign of Glover or movement within the house was seen. Police and the surveillance team became concerned around 5:00pm, and got permission to enter the house at 6:00pm. Two uniformed police knocked on the front door (ostensibly to check on barking dogs) to no answer, and when looking through the rear glass door, saw a hammer lying in a pool of dry blood on a mat. Four detectives searched the house and found Sinclair's battered head wrapped in a bundle of blood-soaked towels. She was naked from the waist down and her pantyhose were tied around her neck. Her genitals were damaged, but Glover later denied raping her. After finding Sinclair's body, police searched the house for Glover, who was found unconscious in the filled bathtub.

Glover later told police he had murdered Sinclair and said that they had been having a relationship for some time. He said that he beat her about the head with his hammer, removed her pantyhose, and strangled her with it. Glover rolled the body onto a mat, wrapped four towels around her extensive head wounds to stem the flow of blood, and dragged her body across the room, leaving a trail of blood. He ran the bath, swallowed a handful of Valium with a bottle of Vat 69, slashed his left wrist, and lay in the tub to die.

== Trial ==
Glover's trial commenced on 19 November 1991. Glover pleaded not guilty to his crimes on the grounds of diminished responsibility. A professor of psychiatry, who reviewed the case, said Glover had "built up a pile of hostility and aggression from childhood against his mother, then his mother-in-law. She was the lightning conductor, and when she died he had to take it out on other people." They added that Glover's was a very unusual case because few serial killers exist, and most of them are mentally ill, and/or have an organic disease of the brain; Glover was assessed as sane at the time of the murders.

Dr. John Shand, a psychiatrist testifying at the trial for the defence, said Glover had a severe personality disorder. The Crown prosecutor maintained that Glover was well aware of his actions. When he killed, he was planning what to do with the victim's stolen money, and took time to clean his hammer with acid to destroy forensic evidence. Glover was impotent and had no interest in sex. Tying the pantyhose so tightly around his victims' necks was to make sure they were dead, while also trying to trick the police into thinking that this was the work of a sexually motivated killer.

Glover was addicted to poker machines. The easiest way for him to get more money for his gambling was to steal. After the guilty verdict was delivered by the jury, Justice Wood stated that he was dealing with an extremely dangerous prisoner:

He is able to choose when to attack and when to stay his hand. He is cunning and able to cover his tracks. It is plain that he has chosen his moments carefully. Although the crimes have been opportunistic, he has not gone in where the risks were overwhelming.

The period since January 1989 has been one of intense and serious crime involving extreme violence inflicted on elderly women, accompanied by theft or robbery of their property. On any view, the prisoner has shown himself to be an exceedingly dangerous person and that view was mirrored by the opinions of the psychiatrists who gave evidence at his trial.

I have no alternative other than to impose the maximum available sentence, which means that the prisoner will be required to spend the remainder of his natural life in gaol.

It is inappropriate to impose any minimum term to be served before release on parole. Having regard to those life sentences, this is not a case where the prisoner may ever be released pursuant to any order of this court.

He is never to be released.

== "Confession" sketch ==
Days before Glover killed himself, he handed his last outside visitor a sketch of a park. Glover noted two pine trees in the image. In the middle of the right pine tree, the number "nine" could be seen between leaves and branches. The number nine is said to represent either the total number of murders or the number of unsolved murders committed by Glover.

Unsolved murders that may have been committed by Glover include:

1. Emmie May Anderson, 78, East Melbourne (19 October 1961)
2. Irene Kiddle, 61, St Kilda (22 March 1963)
3. Elsie Boyes, 63, Prahran (3 June 1967)
4. Christina Yankos, 63, Albert Park (9 April 1968)
5. Florence Broadhurst, 78, Paddington (16 October 1977)
6. Josephine McDonald, 72, Ettalong (29 August 1984)
7. Wanda Amundsen, 83, Umina (21 November 1986)

== Imprisonment and death ==
Glover was imprisoned at Lithgow Prison, where he was held in a maximum-security prison cell.

In May 2005 Glover collapsed in his cell and was placed on suicide watch after telling prison officers "I've had enough – I want to kill myself." He was examined by a mental health review team, and monitored by closed circuit television. He was also given medical examinations as a follow-up to the two cancer surgeries he had undergone the year before.

On 10 September 2005, Glover was found dead in his Lithgow maximum security prison cell and pronounced dead at 1:25 pm. The 72-year-old serial killer was confirmed to have hung himself.

== Media ==
Glover's serial murders were the focus of three episodes on different crime series: Crime Investigation Australia series-one episode "No More Grannies / The Granny Killer", series-two episode of Forensic Investigators entitled "Granny Killer", and an episode of Under Investigation hosted by Liz Hayes.

Mandy Beaumont's 2024 novel The Thrill of It was inspired by Glover's crimes.

== See also ==
- List of serial killers by country
- List of serial killers by number of victims
