= Vic Hambridge =

Australian rules footballer

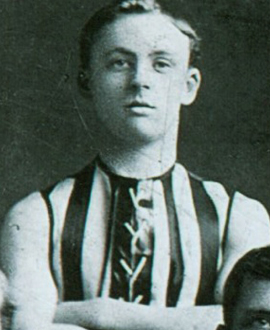
- Hambridge in 1906

Personal information
- Full name: Victor Norman Hambridge
- Born: 5 October 1886; Kensington, Victoria
- Died: 22 June 1981 (aged 94); Mount Waverley, Victoria
- Original team: Essendon (VFA)
- Height: 168 cm (5 ft 6 in)
- Weight: 64 kg (141 lb)
- Position: Wing

Playing career^{1}
Years	Club	Games (Goals)
1906–07	Collingwood	8 (3)
- ^{1} Playing statistics correct to the end of 1907.

Victor Norman Hambridge (5 October 1886 – 22 June 1981) was an Australian rules footballer who played with Collingwood in the Victorian Football League (VFL).
