= Cowley's pie cart =

Eatery in Adelaide, Australia

Cowley's pie cart was a late-night eatery which operated in Adelaide outside the General Post Office, Adelaide on Franklin Street close to Victoria Square.

== History ==
Adelaide's pie carts consisted of a large self-contained enclosed trailer with a single awning servery opening to the footpath. There was no seating supplied, the range of food available (apart from pies and pasties) was very limited, and the only drinks available were tea, coffee and a small range of soft drinks. A notable characteristic of Adelaide's pie carts was their democratic nature: every class of person could be seen at the counter.

Cowley's pie cart was opened by William "Bill" Cowley, owner of Cowleys Bakeries, of Cross Road, Glandore, in 1937.

Bill was a nephew of Joseph Cowley, one of Sturt's 1845 expedition party; a grandmother, Rebecca Bevis, migrated to South Australia in 1838 on the same ship (Pestonjee Bomanjee) as Governor Gawler. She married Thomas Cowley, one of those closely involved with John Ridley's invention of the stripper.

A specialty of Cowley's pie cart was the "pie floater"; a meat pie upside-down on a plate, surrounded by a generous serving of thick pea soup (made from blue boiler peas), and frequently topped with tomato sauce.

The last owner/operators of this pie cart were Ray Purvis and his family, who had a licence to operate it from 5 pm (when the post office closed), until around midnight, being then one of the few food outlets open in Adelaide after 9 pm.

== See also ==
- Harry's Cafe de Wheels
