= Florence Broadhurst =

Australian artist (1899–1977)

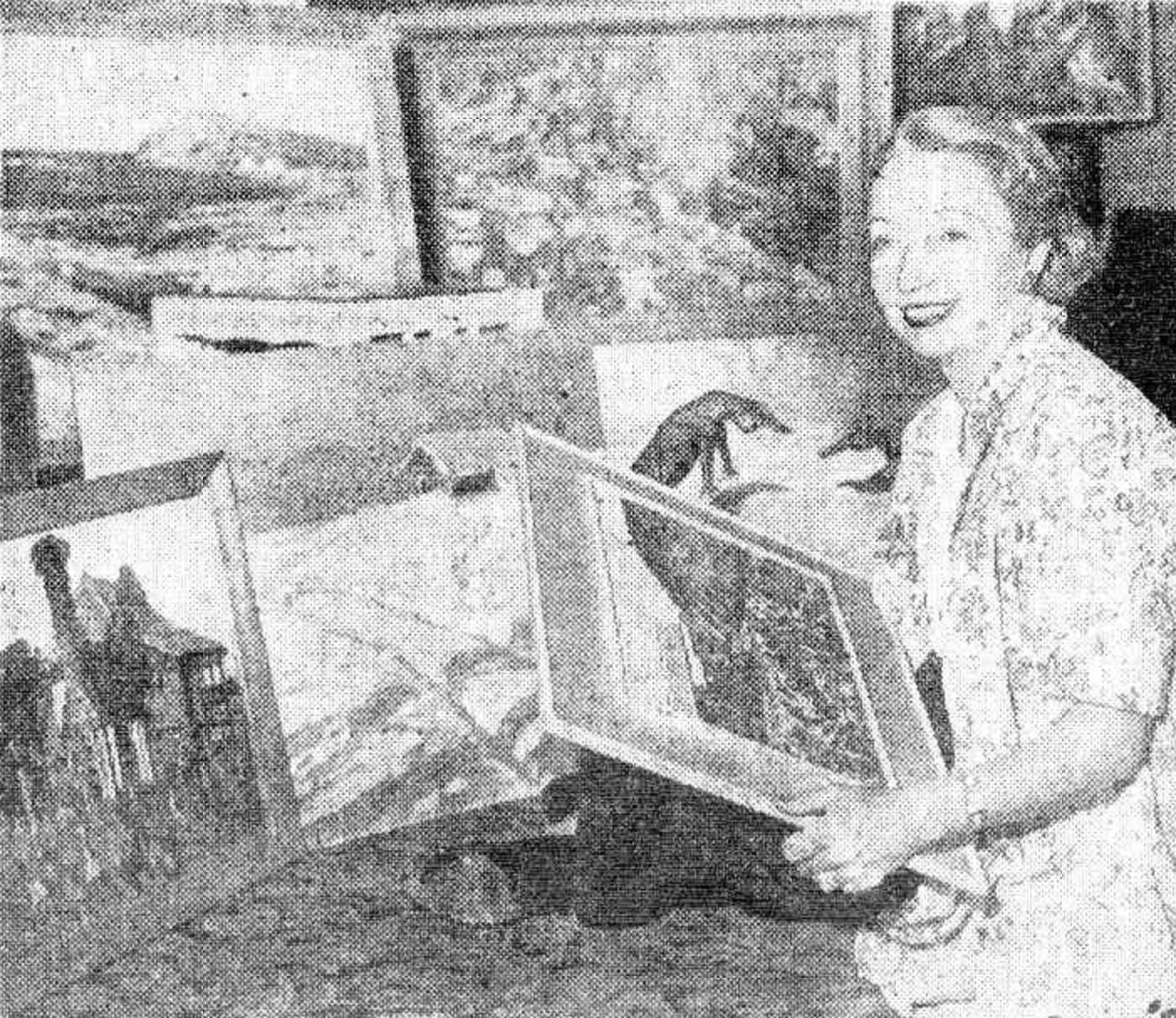
- Broadhurst at her Manly flat, 1954
- Born: Florence Maud Broadhurst; 28 July 1899; Mount Perry, Queensland, Australia
- Died: 15 October 1977 (aged 78); Paddington, New South Wales, Australia
- Cause of death: Homicide by Blunt Force Injury
- Other names: Miss Bobby, Bobby Broadhurst, Madame Pellier
- Occupations: Painter; landscape artist; singer; dancer; motor dealer; charity worker; wallpaper and fabrics designer
- Spouse: Percy Walter Gladstone Kann (m.1929)
- Partner: Leonard Lloyd-Lewis (1939 – c. 1960)
- Children: 1

Florence Maud Broadhurst (28 July 1899 – 15 October 1977) was an Australian painter, wallpaper and fabrics designer and vaudevillian singer, dancer and musician as well as a businesswoman, charity worker and teacher.

Broadhurst was murdered in the Sydney suburb of Paddington, New South Wales and the perpetrator has not been apprehended. The main suspect in the case is the English-Australian serial killer John Wayne Glover, who was convicted of murdering six elderly women in the Sydney North Shore district between 1989 and 1990 and is thought by police to have been responsible for other deaths.

== Early life ==
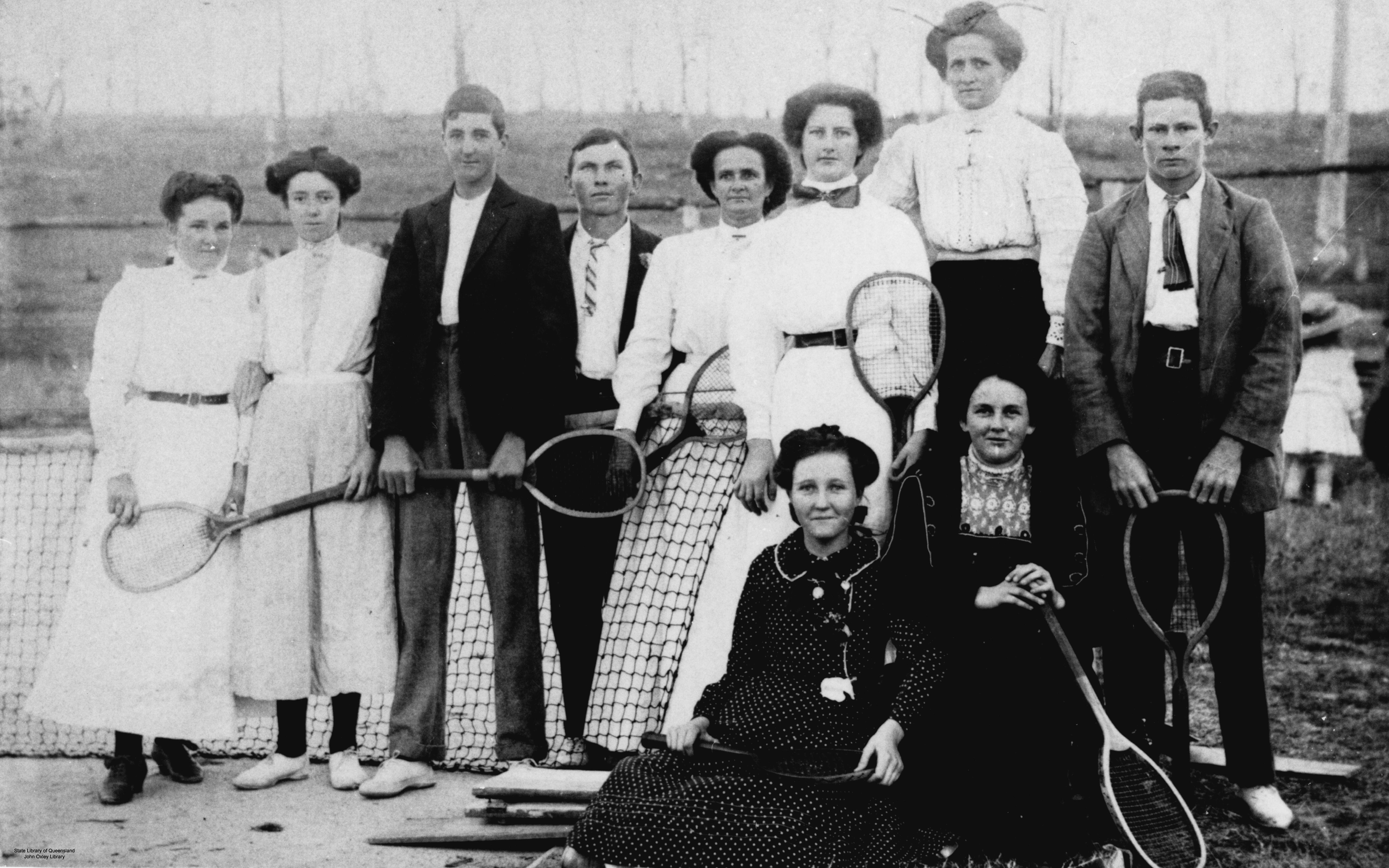
Tennis Party at Mount Perry (Florence Broadhurst is second from left.)

Broadhurst was born in Mount Perry, Queensland, at Mungy Station, to stockman, turned grazier and hotelier William Broadhurst and Margaret Anne (née Crawford).

== Performance and teaching ==
She became a singer, winning local eisteddfods, and joined a group known as the Smart Set Diggers who performed in Toowoomba, Queensland. On 4 December 1922, she left Australia and taking the stage name of Miss Bobby she joined a comedy sextet known as the "Globe Trotters" and later the "Broadcasters", as well as performing with the "Carlton Follies" and "Carlton Sparklers" who toured Southeast Asia and China.

She received mainly positive reviews for her singing and charleston dancing and was photographed in various overseas English-language newspapers including the Eastern Mail Delhi and the South China Morning Post.

In 1926, she established the Broadhurst Academy in Shanghai, offering tuition in violin, pianoforte, voice production, banjolele playing, modern ballroom dancing, classical dancing, musical culture and journalism.

After her return to Queensland in 1927, she sustained head injuries in a car accident. She then went to England and in 1929, married Percy Walter Gladstone Kann, an English stockbroker. They co-directed Pellier Ltd, Robes & Modes, and she called herself Madame Pellier. Kann and Broadhurst separated, and Broadhurst married diesel engineer Leonard Lloyd-Lewis, living in Banstead, Surrey.

During World War II she joined the Australian Women's Voluntary Services, offering hospitality to Australian soldiers. In 1949, the couple and their son Robert moved to Australia, where she maintained the fiction that she was British.

== Artist ==
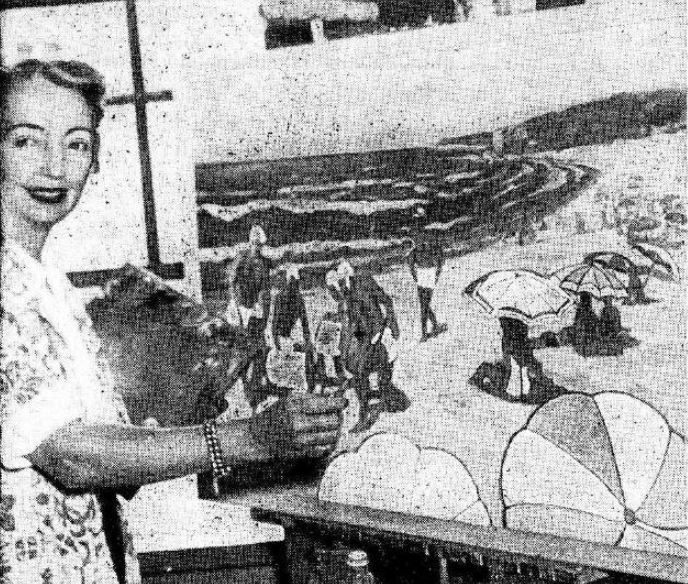
Florence Broadhurst painting "Lifesaver's Rehearsal" in 1954.

She travelled widely and produced 114 landscape paintings, which were first shown as "Paintings of Australia" in 1954 at David Jones Art Gallery, Sydney, then later in Brisbane and Canberra. In the late 1950s (or 1961) Lloyd-Lewis left her for a woman younger than their own son.

She was a foundation member of the Art Gallery Society of New South Wales and a member of the Society of Interior Designers of Australia, was a teacher of printmaking and sculpture at the National Art School and was also involved in a variety of charitable activities. Broadhurst then ran a motor sales company with her son. She travelled to England in 1973 to receive cell therapy treatment for her failing eyesight and hearing.

== Wallpapers ==
In 1959 Broadhurst established Australian (Hand Printed) Wallpapers Pty Ltd., which later became Florence Broadhurst Wallpapers Pty Ltd, advertised as "the only studio of its kind in the world". She worked from a studio at 12-24 Roylston Street, Paddington. Her brightly coloured geometric and nature-inspired oversized designs were all hand-printed. Technical advances made in her studio included printing onto metallic surfaces, the development of a washable, vinyl-coating finish and a drying rack system that allowed her wallpapers to be produced in large quantities. By 1972, her wallpapers reportedly contained around 800 designs in eighty different colours, while by the mid-1970s she monopolised the quality end of the Australian market and was exporting worldwide.

Broadhurst's library of wooden silk-printing screens and film positives was sold to Wilson Fabrics and Wallcoverings in 1978, just one year after her death. However, the decline of wallpaper as a popular form of home furnishing in the 1980s saw the collection languish, and it was later re-sold to Signature Prints Pty Ltd. Signature Prints in turn was purchased by a conglomerate led by CEO David Lennie in 1989. Lennie had previously run a small wallpaper company in Auckland, New Zealand and briefly met Broadhurst before her death.

In the late 1990s, Chee Soon & Fitzgerald, a tiny but influential Sydney design store, held the wholesale and retail distribution rights for Broadhurst wallpaper. This led to some popularity in Sydney design circles but little media attention. In the early 2000s, Signature Prints made a conscious decision to promote Broadhurst's designs overseas, specifically in the UK. This effort, coupled with an international resurgence of interest in wallpaper, greatly increased the designer's profile and led to distribution deals being struck for both the UK and the US in 2003.

In 2017 the Florence Broadhurst archive was purchased by Signature Design Archive and Signature Prints no longer has any association with Broadhurst or her designs. Over the years, some licences have been granted for use other than wallpaper, such as high-end fashion pieces by designers Akira Isogawa, Nicky Zimmermann and Karen Walker. In late 2008 a rug collection featuring ten Broadhurst designs was released in Australia and the US. The French swimwear company Vilebrequin released a collection using a print by Broadhurst for Father's Day 2019 titled "Rabbits and Poodles." They cite her designs as being the "perfect antidote to ageing".

== Death ==
Broadhurst was a victim of homicide, having been viciously beaten in her Paddington business premises on 15 October 1977. The murder was never solved, but there has been some speculation that Broadhurst was a victim of English-Australian serial killer John Wayne Glover, who was convicted of murdering six elderly women in the Sydney North Shore district between 1989 and 1990 and is thought by police to have been responsible for other deaths.

In Gillian Armstrong's film Unfolding Florence: The Many Lives of Florence Broadhurst, friends and employees of Broadhurst stated that they believed the killer may have been known to her and that the motive may have been financial. This was due to the presence of two cups of tea near her body, suggesting a meeting or appointment, and the killer's apparent knowledge of her factory's layout.

== See also ==
- List of Orientalist artists
- List of unsolved murders (1900–1979)
- Orientalism

== Film ==
- Gillian Armstrong, Unfolding Florence: The Many Lives of Florence Broadhurst, docu-drama, 2006
