= Vili Milisits =

Australian chef (1948–2021)

Vilmos "Vili" Milisits OAM (8 September 1948 – 26 March 2021) was an Australian pastry chef and businessman of Hungarian origin, noted for the businesses Vili's Pies and Vili's Café (also known as the "Café de Vili's") in Adelaide, South Australia.

== Early life and career ==
The Milisits family escaped the Hungarian Revolution in 1956 and migrated to Adelaide, South Australia. Their first home was a modest place on Carrington Street in the city. Vili left school aged 14 to work at Kazzy's Cake Shop in Burnside, run by fellow countryman Kazzy Ujvari. After completing his apprenticeship he ventured to open his own Continental cake shop using rented equipment and employing his fiancée, Rosemary and his sister, as he could not secure a bank loan. (His sister later opened her own patisserie, "Olga's Cakes", in Leigh Street, Adelaide). Around 1965 he purchased a home at 14 Manchester Street, Mile End, which doubled as a bakery.

In 1978 Milisits expanded his range to include Australian-style pies and pasties, but with pastry and spices more to his own taste. Business steadily grew and he owned much of the property along Manchester Street, has 200 employees in Adelaide, and has expanded interstate.

=== Vilis Café ===
Vili's Café, on Manchester Street, Mile End, is a restaurant where any of the bakery's range may be purchased for consumption or to take away. There is also a range of simple meals and alcoholic beverages available at sensible prices to be served at the tables.

One of the few places in Adelaide where Adelaide's traditional pie floater is still served, the café is open 24 hours, every day of the year and attracts a large cross-section of Adelaide's population. It is popularly known as the "Café de Vilis", a punning reference to Harry's Cafe de Wheels of Sydney. Three other Vili's cafe locations have since opened, in Blair Athol, Elizabeth and Hillcrest.

== Personal life ==
Milisits married Rosemary, and they had two children, Simon and Alison, who are involved in the business.

Milisits was a keen fisherman, and participated in many social activities. He was a supporter of a large number of local charities as well as sporting groups both amateur and professional. The walls of Vilis Café are proudly adorned with mementoes from some of these organisations.

Milisits underwent a lung transplant operation on 26 March 2021 at St Vincent's Hospital, Sydney. The operation was successful, but he died the next day from an unrelated medical condition, aged 72.

== Recognition ==
In 2005, Milisits and his wife Rosemary were jointly awarded the Medal of the Order of Australia (OAM) in recognition of their charity work. A State Memorial Service was held at the Adelaide Festival Centre on 30 April 2021 and the Australian National Flag was flown at half-mast throughout South Australia on that day.
