= Gibbs family (bakers) =

British baking family

James Cross Gibbs (1845 – 25 December 1927), generally referred to as James Gibbs, was a British seaman who retired to South Australia and turned to making meat pies; two of his descendants became industrial-scale bakers, founding W. H. Gibbs and Sons, and Glover Gibbs.

== History ==
Gibbs was a native of Beer, Devonshire and, after some years as a sailor in H.M. navy, arrived in South Australia by the Sikh in 1882 or 1883, and joined the crew of HMS Protector, the colony's gunship. He left the service to go into business for himself.

Early bakehouses (approx locations)
1 Brown Street
2 Little Sturt Street
3 Cannon Street

His wife Eliza died in 1893; Their children were:

- William Henry Gibbs (1876–1957) see below
- James Gibbs (1878–1969), here called James Gibbs junior. His eight children include

- Harry Glover Gibbs (1903 – 30 April 1991)
- Francis Peter "Frank" Gibbs (1916–1994)

- John Gibbs (1880–1925)

All three sons became bakers. He married again in 1894 to Mary Jane Anne "Minnie" Burgess (c. 1858 – 21 January 1931); they had two surviving children:

- Laura Emma Burgess Gibbs (1895–1982) married Arthur Raymond Good in 1918
- Levi Francis "Frank" Gibbs (1898–1978) married Vera Lillie — in 1924; had home at Helmsdale (Glenelg East) in 1937. He was Glenelg Town councillor (Glenelg ward) in 1951.

He retired and settled in Glenelg.

He became known for his meat pies, which he made at a bakehouse in the city (perhaps in Little Sturt Street) and sold from a hand-cart at a corner of Rundle and King William streets. He has been credited with the invention or introduction of Adelaide's pie floater.

=== W. H. Gibbs and Sons ===
Gibbs' eldest son William Henry Gibbs (1876–1957) founded the business in George Street, off Halifax Street.

W. H. Gibbs married in October 1900; their ten children included:

- Herbert Charles "Bert" Gibbs (1901–) married Edna Grace in 1929
- Eric James Gibbs (1903–1996) married Rosa Minnie in 1932
- Gordon William "Bill" Gibbs (1905–1998) married Georgina McLennan in November 1929 In 1933 he built a milk bar and cafe, "Gibbs' Quality Shoppe and Bakery" on 67–69 Anzac Highway, Ashford, with a bakery behind the premises.
- Harold Robertson "Jack" Gibbs (1906–2003) married Winifred Evelyn Gallasch in September 1934
- Marjorie Alberta Gibbs (1909–) married Jack Oliver in 1937

In 1923 W. H. Gibbs and Sons opened the "Quick Lunch Cafe" in Flinders Street, closed 1954

In 1927 the firm of W. H. Gibbs and Sons, Limited, was formed with a capital of £10,000 in 10,000 £1 shares, to take over the assets of the company being operated by W. H. Gibbs, H. C. Gibbs and E. J. Gibbs; each taking 2,500 shares.

In 1935 W. H. Gibbs & Sons, Ltd opened a new store at 68 Grenfell Street.

=== Glover Gibbs ===
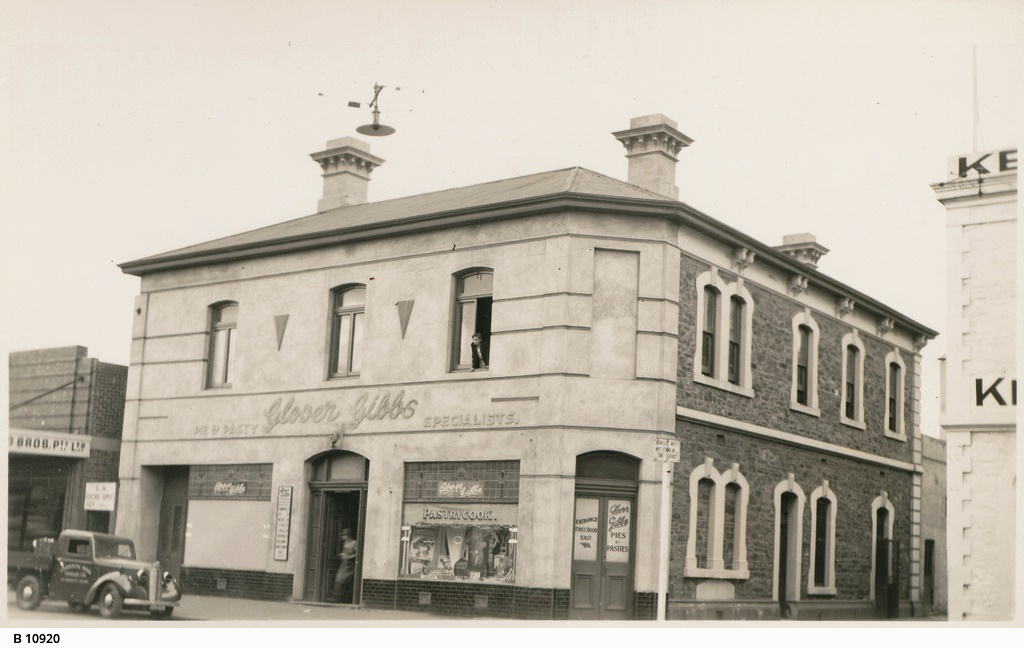
Glover Gibbs shop c. 1942

Harry Glover Gibbs (1903 – 30 April 1991) was a son of James Gibbs junior Harry Glover Gibbs entered into a partnership with (not known), operating a bakery on Cannon Street (off Waymouth Street), also office and cafe at 123 Waymouth Street from 1936. The building was the Shakespeare Hotel until it was de-licensed in 1920.

The partnership was dissolved in 1950 and henceforth run by Gibbs as a sole trader.

Harry Glover Gibbs married Beryl Edwards on 10 November 1928. Their daughter Barbara Gibbs married Ivan Stacey on 10 March 1956.

In February 1972 the company took charge of its new bakery at 71–83 Glynburn Road, Glynde.

== John Gibbs of Brown Street ==
John Gibbs (c. 1855 – July 1927), also from Beer, Devonshire, conducted a bakery and confectionery business (perhaps this one) on Brown Street, now the southern half of Morphett Street. He had a residence in Semaphore. After the death of his wife he opened a shop on Argent Street, Broken Hill and married again, selling up in 1912. His children include:

- Francis John "Frank" Gibbs (1885– ) was born in Port Adelaide, served with 1st AIF, living in Brighton
- Harry, living in Glenelg
- Ethel Maude Gibbs (1883– ), in London
- Elsie May Gibbs (1882–1954) had home in Brighton
- Nellie Evelyn Gibbs (1899–1954) in Semaphore

A family relation is likely but not mentioned anywhere.
