= Meat pie (Australia and New Zealand) =

Pie containing diced or minced meat and gravy

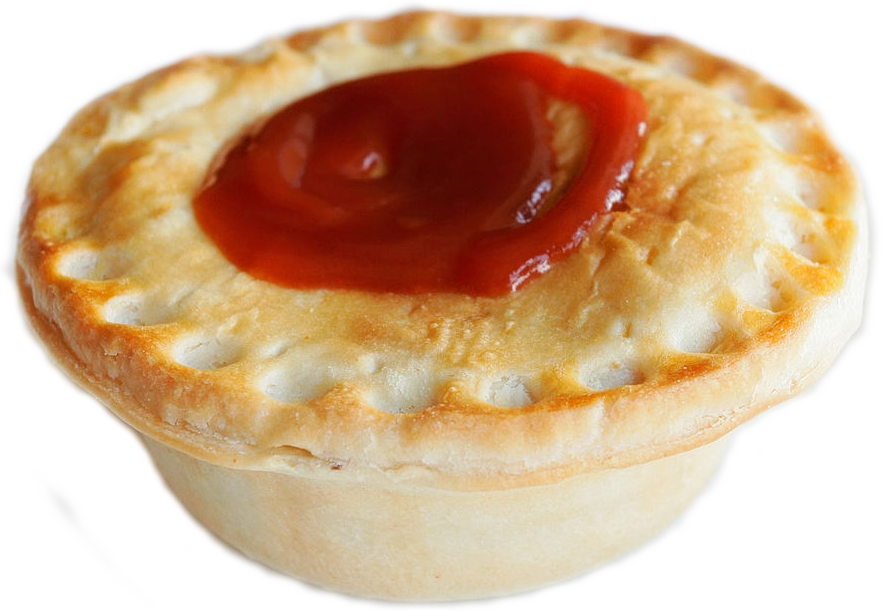
- A typical meat pie with tomato sauce
- Type: Meat pie
- Place of origin: Australia
- Main ingredients: Meat, gravy, shortcrust pastry
- Variations: Onions, mushrooms, cheese

In Australia and New Zealand, a meat pie is a handheld meat pie containing diced or minced meat and gravy, sometimes with other ingredients, in a piecrust. It is often consumed as a takeaway food snack.

A version made with minced beef is considered iconic in Australia and has been described as Australia's national dish. New Zealanders regard it as part of New Zealand cuisine.

== Ingredients, preparation, and serving ==
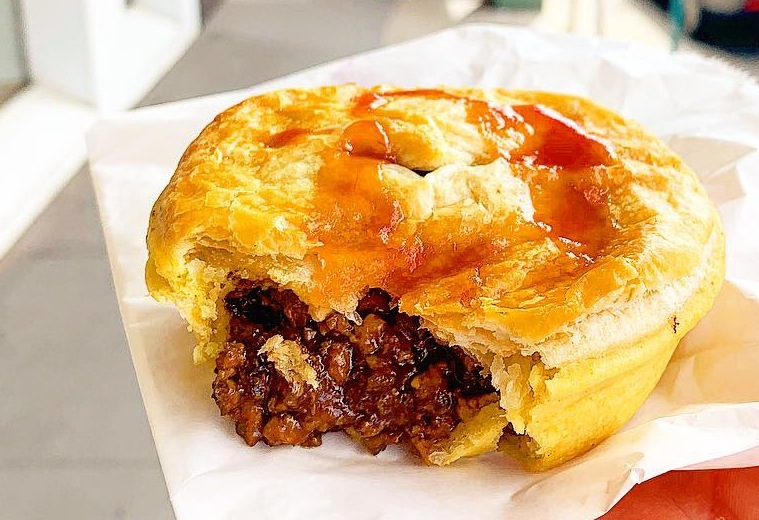
The filling of an Australian meat pie

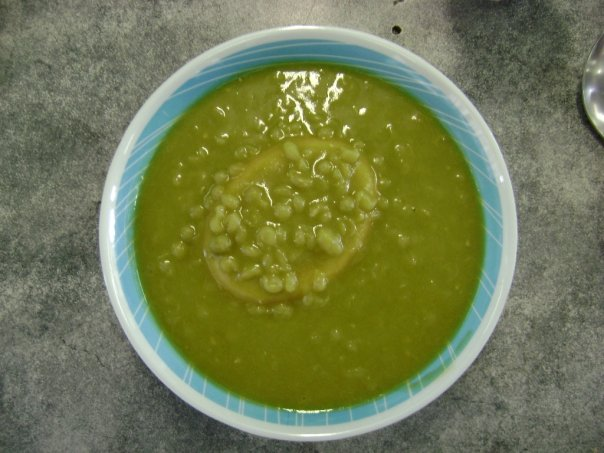
Pie floater

Meat pies can contain any chunked, diced or minced meat in gravy, though beef is most common and minced beef the traditional filling. The meats allowed by FSANZ to make up at least 25% of a commercial meat pie are beef, buffalo, camel, venison, goat, hare, pork, poultry, rabbit and sheep, but versions using other meats exist.

As of 2026, chunkier diced beef pies had become more popular than minced. Other ingredients such as onions, mushrooms, or cheese are sometimes included. Each pie is a single portion of approximately 8 ounces (230 g) baked in a tin with a bottom and top crust of shortcrust pastry which are crimped to form a seal.

Pies are removed from the baking tin whole for serving. They are typically served hot with a ketchup-like tomato sauce spread or dripped on top. The pies are generally eaten out of the hand rather than from a plate with a fork and knife. They are commonly eaten as a takeaway food snack or at football matches.

Meat pies are also used as a component of another Australian dish, the pie floater, in which a pie is submerged upside down in a bowl of pea soup.

== Nutritional value ==
The meats allowed by FSANZ to make up at least 25% of a meat pie are beef, buffalo, camel, venison, goat, hare, pork, poultry, rabbit and sheep. Kangaroo meat, a leaner alternative, is also sometimes used. However, most pie manufacturers specify 'beef' in their ingredients list; typically, those using other types of meat will simply put 'meat' in the list instead. FSANZ requires that a meat pie must contain a minimum of 25% "meat flesh". Meat flesh includes the skeletal muscle of any slaughtered animal as well as any attached animal rind, fat, connective tissue, nerve, blood and blood vessels. Offal (such as brain, heart, kidney, liver, tongue, tripe) must be specified on the label.

== Popularity ==
According to the New York Times, the meat pie is "Australia's most beloved snack"; as of 2026 the yearly consumption was 270 million pies. According to a 2003 study, the average Australian eats more than 12 meat pies each year. According to a 2004 study, the average New Zealander eats 15 meat pies a year.

The minced beef version of the traditional meat pie is considered iconic in Australia. It was described by New South Wales Premier Bob Carr in 2003 as Australia's national dish. New Zealanders also regard the meat pie as a part of New Zealand cuisine.

Meat pies are so strongly associated with Australian culture that one of the terms for the Australian western film genre is "Meat pie western".

== Competitions ==
Pie competitions are common in Australia and New Zealand.

=== The Great Aussie Pie Competition ===
The annual Great Aussie Pie Competition began in 1989 to find commercially produced meat pie produced in Australia, to promote higher quality pie production, and to attempt to increase media attention upon the foodstuff, with the meat pie often dwarfed by the omnipresent advertising of fast food chains.

The contest attracts various pie-makers from all over Australia; the pies for the contest are judged anonymously to avoid bias towards or against specific bakeries or states. Run in parallel to the main contest is one for gourmet pies, with categories for such fillings as chicken, seafood and even vegetarian pies. As well as the main prize, certificates of excellence are awarded for entries that reach set quality standards. The main award is coveted due to the increased sales it generates, with many people travelling interstate to sample the winning pie.

=== Bakels New Zealand Supreme Pie Awards ===
In New Zealand an annual pie competition has been held since 1997. The Bakels New Zealand Supreme Pie Awards to recognises quality pie manufacturers in New Zealand, assisting them in producing award-winning pies and continuing to help foster and encourage developments within this category of baking.

They were entered in 11 categories– mince and gravy; chicken and vegetables; gourmet meat; bacon and egg; gourmet fruit; steak, vegetable and gravy; steak and cheese; vegetarian; mince and cheese; seafood and commercial wholesale pies. The pies were judged on presentation, the pastry on the top and bottom, the filling and the profile.

== Commercial production ==
Meat pies are made in numerous neighbourhood bakery shops in Australia and New Zealand. Commercially-made meat pies most commonly have a circular horizontal cross-section, but commercial pies have been made with oval, square, or rectangular cross-sections.

=== Australia ===
Manufacturers of pies in Australia tend to be state-based, reflecting the long distances involved with interstate transport and lack of refrigeration capabilities in the early years of pie production. Many pies are sold ready-to-eat at smaller outlets and are sold unbranded although some may be locally produced by a brand-name vendor, or even imported. Frozen pies are heated prior to serving.

An Australian meat pie, first produced in 1947, by L. T. McClure in a small bakery in Bendigo, became the well-known Four'n Twenty pie. Due to its association with Australian rules football, Four'n Twenty has iconic status in Victoria. Other manufacturers well predate this brand.

Sargents—once the dominant meat pie brand of New South Wales, but not made since 2022—could trace its pie making back to 1891.

In South Australia, Balfours have been making pies for over a century, but Vili's began in the post-war era. Both of these pie makers supply pies to various venues hosting Australian rules football games.

Produced in Western Australia, Mrs Mac's Pies are sold nationwide, found mostly in service stations and corner stores, competing with other brands in the contested takeaway hotbox market on the basis of quality and fillings other than the normal fare.

In Victoria, some of the well known and famous pie makers include the makers of two of Australia's most famous pies—Four'n Twenty and Patties—both manufactured by Patties Foods in Bairnsdale. Also now part of Patties Food, Herbert Adams pies have a history extending back to 1909, when Herbert Adams established bakeries in Prahran and Brunswick.

In Tasmania, the main manufacturer of pies is National Pies. National Pies make typical beef mince pies, as well as "Cottage Pies", which are topped with mashed potato. National Pies' mince pies are rectangular in shape, as opposed to most other brands, which are round.

'Railway pies', once served on country trains and at refreshment rooms of the NSWGR, achieved a reputation for their high meat content and flavour. In 1942, it was reported that 2.3 million of these pies were consumed over a 12-month period. All the pies were baked in a facility under Central Station, until around 1980.

=== New Zealand ===
Big Ben Pies have been making pies since 1969 in Auckland, New Zealand and sells 13 million pies per year.

In 1977, during the time that American fast food restaurants moved into New Zealand, Progressive Enterprises created Georgie Pie, a fast food restaurant with a menu based on meat pies. The pies were batch made and frozen at Progressive's Māngere plant. The first Georgie Pie restaurant opened in Kelston, Auckland, and at its peak in the mid-1990s had become a chain of 32 restaurants across New Zealand. However, after a major expansion, Georgie Pie became uneconomic to run and was eventually sold to McDonald's New Zealand in 1996. The last restaurant at Mission Bay, Auckland, closed in 1998. In June 2013, McDonald's started a trial relaunch of Georgie Pie, selling one flavour of pie (Steak Mince 'n' Cheese) through eleven of its restaurants in Auckland and Hamilton.

== Similar foods ==
- Bierock
- Lihapiirakka
- Pasty
- Pirozhki
- Pot pie
- Steak pie
- Tourtiere
- Runza
- Sausage Sizzle

== See also ==
- List of pies, tarts and flans
