= Pie floater =

Australian meat pie and soup dish

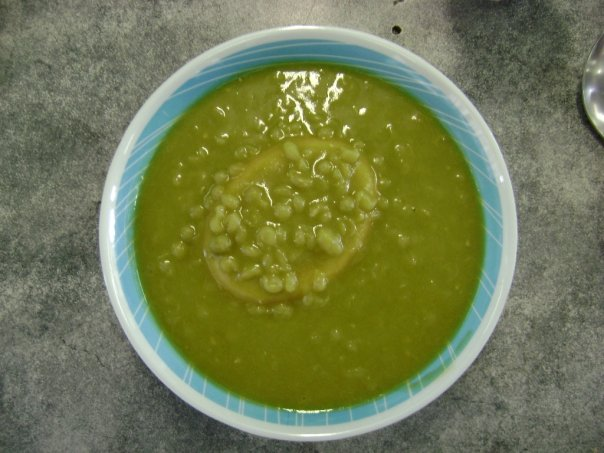
- Type: Street food
- Place of origin: South Australia
- Main ingredients: Australian meat pie, pea soup

The pie floater is an Australian dish sold in Adelaide. It consists of a meat pie in a thick pea soup, typically with the addition of tomato sauce. Believed to have been first created in the 1890s, the pie floater gained popularity as a meal sold by South Australian pie carts. In 2003, it was recognised as a South Australian Heritage Icon.

== Development ==
Pea soup with meat has long been part of English culinary history, with mentions in the 19th century, including the "pea and pie supper" (in Yorkshire), "pea soup with eel", and suet dumplings or saveloys. (Dumplings in soup were known as "floaters".) It may have developed from those dishes, which are useful for feeding groups of people on a budget, such as at a sports match or at harvest time. A pie floater commonly consists of a traditional Australian-style meat pie, usually sitting, but sometimes submerged (traditionally upside down) in a bowl of thick pea soup made from blue boiler peas. It is often self-garnished with tomato sauce, and the consumer may also add a combination of mint sauce, salt, pepper, or malt vinegar according to personal preference.

South Australian records credit the pie floater's popularity in the 1890s to one Ern "Shorty" Bradley of Port Pirie; Bradley's old employer Jim Gibbs of Adelaide is another candidate.

== Pie carts ==
Pie floaters were typically purchased in the street from pie-carts as a late evening meal. Pie-carts are typically a form of caravan/trailer/cart, originally horse-drawn, with an elongated "window" along one or both sides where customers could sit or (more usually) stand to eat their purchases. The pie-cart was typically moved into position at lunchtime and in the evening. As traffic became busier and on-street car-parking in demand, the carts evolved to have one window on the "footpath side", and were moved into position after afternoon peak-hour traffic had ebbed. They did business until late evening or early morning, after which they were returned to their daytime storage locations.

South Australia has had pie carts in the Adelaide metropolitan area since the 1870s. In the evenings, the Norwood pie-cart was located on The Parade adjacent to the Norwood Town Hall. It was also the only place where members of the public could buy draught Hall's "Stonie" ginger beer direct from the keg. In the Adelaide city centre in the 1880s, there were 13 pie-carts operating in King William Street and North Terrace. By 1915 there were nine pie-carts in operation. By 1958 this had reduced to two: Balfour's pie-cart on North Terrace outside the Adelaide railway station, and Cowley's in Victoria Square outside the Adelaide General Post Office. In 2007, the Glenelg tram line was extended from Victoria Square along King William Street and North Terrace past Adelaide railway station, and the Balfour's pie-cart was forced to close.

In 2003, the South Australian National Trust traced the history of the pie floater back over 130 years. The pie floater was recognised as a South Australian Heritage Icon by the National Trust of South Australia, although it is now available at very few locations; among them are the Café de Vilis, Enjoy Bakery on Norwood Parade, O'Connell Street Bakery, North Adelaide and the Upper Sturt General Store.

== See also ==
- Australian meat pie
- List of legume dishes
