= Not Fourteen Again =

1996 documentary film

- Directed by: Gillian Armstrong
- Written by: Gillian Armstrong
- Produced by: Gillian Armstrong; Jenny Day
- Starring: Kerry Carlson; Diana Doman; Josie Petersen
- Cinematography: Steve Arnold
- Edited by: Suresh Ayyar
- Music by: Peter Dasent
- Release date: 1996
- Running time: 110 minutes
- Country: Australia
- Language: English

Not Fourteen Again is a 1996 documentary film written, directed and co-produced by Gillian Armstrong. It is the fourth in a series of films looking at the changing lives of three women. It follows on from Smokes & Lollies (1976), Fourteen's Good, Eighteen's Better (1981) and Bingo, Bridesmaids & Braces (1988); it was followed by Love, Lust & Lies (2010).

== Reception ==
Writing in Variety, David Stratton said: "Result is a passionate, intriguing series of character studies that should find a theatrical niche in Oz, and will have no difficulty obtaining slots on TV stations elsewhere". Matthew Gilbert of The Boston Globe said: "The results are fascinating. Armstrong consistently finds drama and heroism in the unremarkable lives of the three original women, as they've learned lessons about family and society the hard way". In The Age, Barbara Creed reviewed it positively, saying: "Engaging and accessible, Not Fourteen Again is one of the best Australian documentaries in years". Sandra Hall in The Sydney Morning Herald said: "Perhaps the greatest strength of Not Fourteen Again is its success in giving due weight and importance to the so-called ordinary rituals of family life".

== Awards ==
- 1996 Australian Film Institute Awards
  - Best Documentary - Gillian Armstrong - won
  - Best Achievement in Cinematography in a Non-Feature Film - Steve Arnold - nominated
