= Patties pie =

Australian food manufacturing company

Patties Pies
- Type: Pie
- Place of origin: Australia
- Region or state: Victoria
- Created by: Patties Foods
- Serving temperature: Hot

Patties Pies are a brand of meat pie created by Peter and Annie Rijs, in a bakery named "Patties" in Lakes Entrance, Victoria

The Patties Pie manufacturing plant in Bairnsdale, Victoria currently produces processed meat pie products such as Party 30 Pack, East Meets West Combo Pack and Patties Pie Bites

== See also ==
- Australian meat pie
