= Unfolding Florence: The Many Lives of Florence Broadhurst =

- Unfolding Florence: The Many Lives of Florence Broadhurst promotional poster
- Directed by: Gillian Armstrong
- Written by: Katherine Thomson
- Produced by: Sue Clothier; Charles Hannah
- Starring: Judi Farr; Felicity Price
- Cinematography: John Radel
- Edited by: Nicholas Beauman
- Music by: Paul Grabowsky
- Distributed by: Becker Entertainment
- Release date: 28 January 2006
- Running time: 82 minutes
- Country: Australia
- Language: English

Unfolding Florence: The Many Lives of Florence Broadhurst, also known as A Colourful Life, is a 2006 documentary/drama based on the life of Florence Broadhurst. Starring Felicity Price, the film was written by Katherine Thomson and directed by Gillian Armstrong. The Australian documentary includes interviews with friends, family members and employees who knew Florence Broadhurst before her mysterious death in 1977. The film had a mixed critical response and was nominated for 4 awards despite being relatively obscure.

== Cast ==
- Felicity Price as Young Florence Broadhurst
- Judi Farr as Florence Broadhurst
- Peter Whitford as Voice

== Synopsis ==
Unfolding Florence: The Many Lives of Florence Broadhurst chronicles the life of Florence Broadhurst, an Australian designer who owned her own fashion design company in London during the 1930s. Later in life she moved to Sydney, Australia, and became a painter, socialite and charity fund-raiser. At 60 years old she began her most prolific and successful occupation, becoming a wallpaper designer. Florence Broadhurst was murdered in her studio on 15 October 1977, at the age of 78. The film includes interviews, dramatizations and animations which are used to illustrate Broadhurst's unusual lifestyle.

== Reception ==
The film received mixed reviews from critics, some calling it cluttered and difficult to follow, while others applauded the director on her achievement.

== Box office ==
Unfolding Florence: The Many Lives of Florence Broadhurst grossed $429,248 at the box office in Australia.

== See also ==
- Cinema of Australia
