= Mrs Mac's Pies =

Food manufacturing company

Mrs Mac's
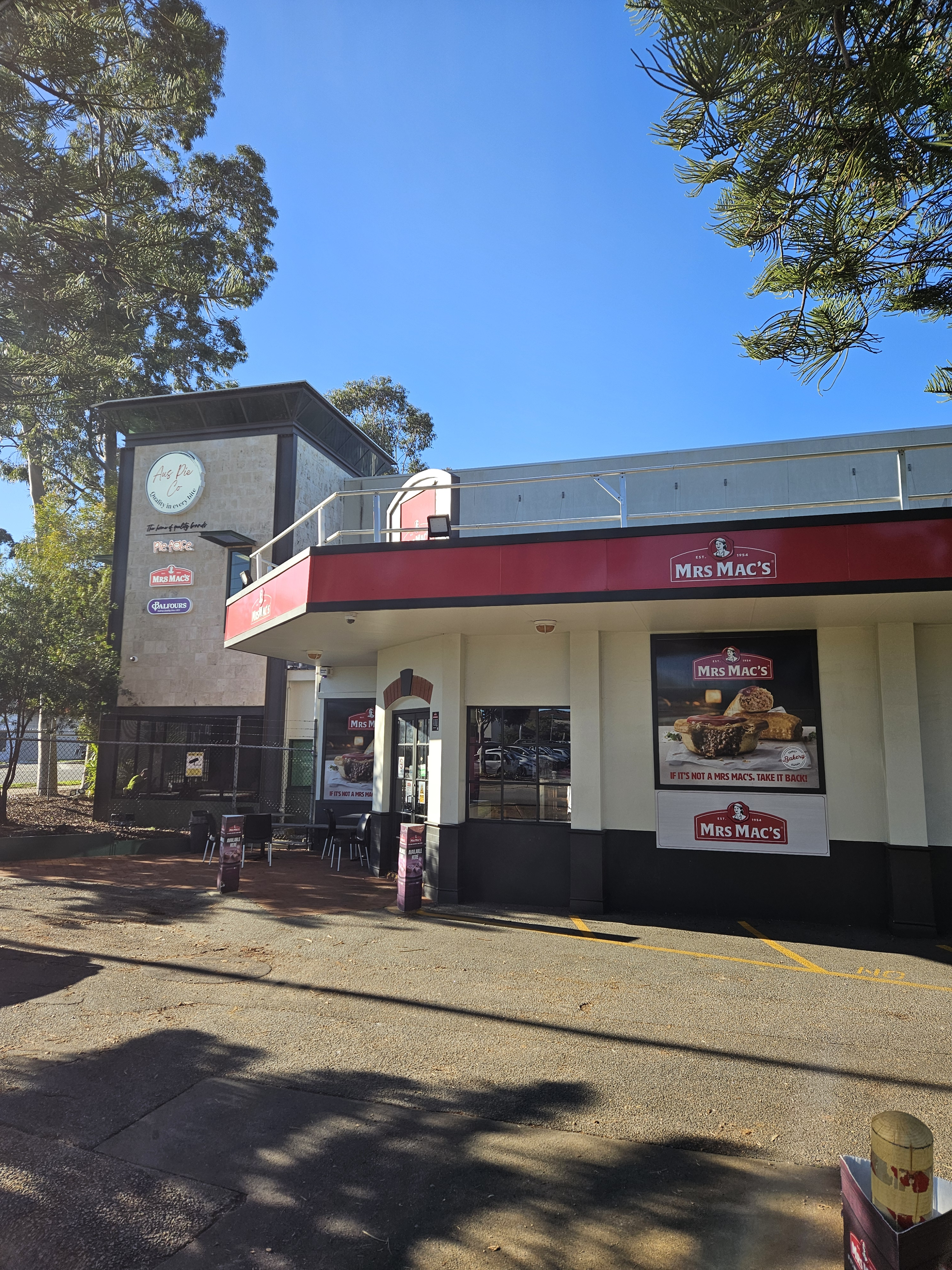
- A Mrs Mac's pie shop storefront in the Perth suburb of Morley, Western Australia.
- Type: Private
- Industry: Meat pies and Pie shops
- Founded: 1954; 72 years ago in Perth, Australia
- Founder: Ken Macgregor
- Headquarters: Morley, Western Australia, Australia
- Key people: Bruce Feodoroff, CEO
- Parent: Aus Pie Co
- Website: www.mrsmacs.com.au

Mrs Mac's Pies is an Australian food company manufacturing Australiasian-type meat pies sold throughout Australia and New Zealand and produced in Perth, Western Australia.

== History ==
In the 1940s, Ken Macgregor started up a small business in Melbourne manufacturing cakes, yeast buns and pies. By 1954, the owner had moved his family to Perth and restarted his wholesale business as "Bakewell Pies". The business moved to the Morley site from its Northbridge bakery in 1968 and the next generation of the family; Iain Macgregor became the new owner of the business. In the late 1980s, the business had seen vast growth in distribution, new technology and products developed, and the company rebranded to the Mrs Mac's name.

In February 2015, Mrs Mac's appointed Paul Slaughter as CEO. In February 2021, Jonathan Moss took over as CEO after Slaughter left the company.

Mrs Mac's was acquired by Aus Pie Co in November 2022.

== Products ==
The Mrs Mac's range grew in 2016 with the introduction of gluten-free pies.

Mrs Mac's Good Eating range has gained the Heart Foundation Tick of Approval, Healthy Kids Amber Rating, and FOCiS Approval for a number of their products.

Mrs Mac's has attained BRC (now BRCGS) accreditation. BRC is a global food safety system standard based on HACCP principles (Hazard Analysis and Critical Control Point) and Good Manufacturing Practices to ensure production of a safe-quality product. The system is third-party audited on a regular basis in addition to other specific customer and retailer audits.

== Marketing ==
In 2010, Mrs Mac's launched a new look with new packaging, advertising, social media and promotions driving the tagline: "If it's not a Mrs Mac's, take it back!"

In 2014, Mrs Mac's underwent a rebrand. On the back of it, a series of online content was produced highlighting use of 100% Aussie beef, hand-checking as a quality measure, and that their pastry was made the old-fashioned way. They also brought the 'show' on the road with the Roadtrip campaign and the radio Nova Team.

== See also ==
- Australiasian meat pie
