= J.J. Holland Park =

Park in Melbourne, Australia

Coordinates: 37.7975°S 144.9245°E

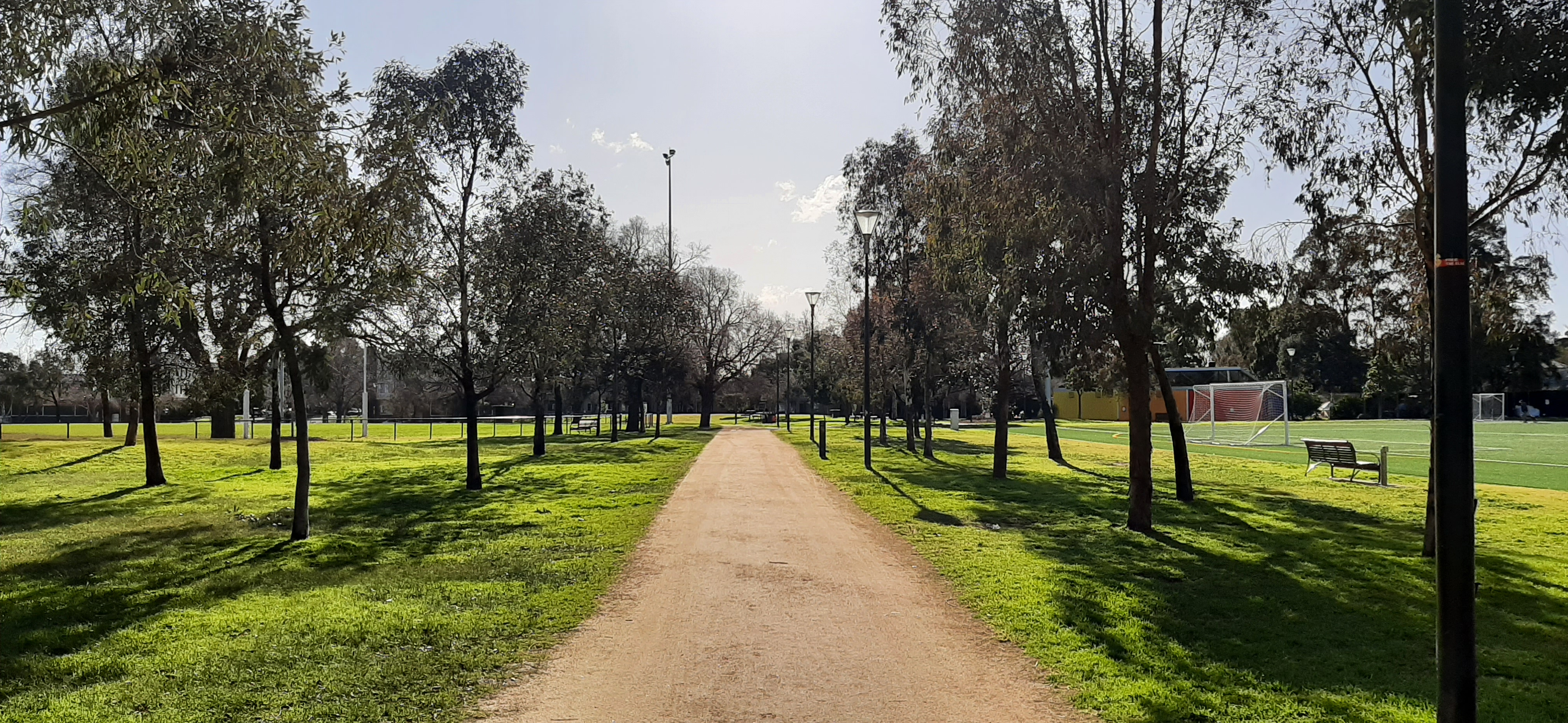
J.J. Holland Park Park, 2022

J.J. Holland Park is a large multi-use park in the Melbourne suburb of Kensington. It is named after John Joseph Holland (1877–1955), who was the member for Flemington in the Victorian Legislative Assembly for over 30 years from 1925, as well as a Melbourne city councillor.

The park, which is freehold land owned by the City of Melbourne, covers approximately 10 hectares and is triangular in shape.
