= Kensington, Victoria =

Kensington
- Suburb
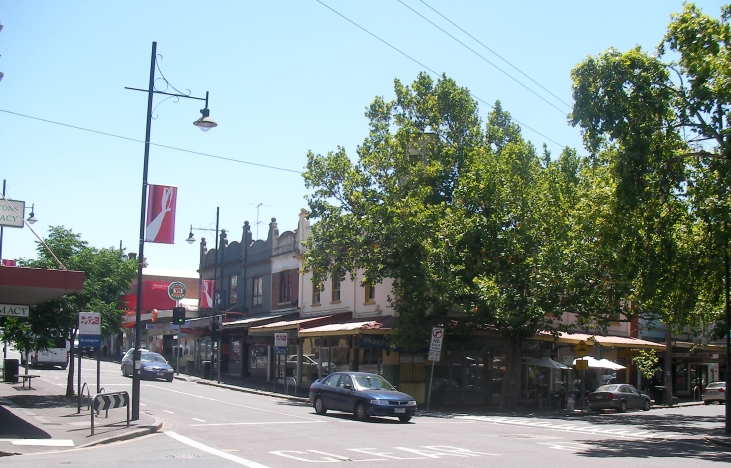
- The corner of Bellair Street and Macaulay Road, opposite the main railway station - 2007

- Interactive map of Kensington
- Coordinates: 37.791°S 144.931°E
- Country: Australia
- State: Victoria
- City: Melbourne
- LGA: City of Melbourne
- Location: 4 km (2.5 mi) from Melbourne

Government
  - State electorate: Melbourne
  - Federal division: Maribyrnong

Area
  - Total: 2.1 km^{2} (0.81 sq mi)

Population
  - Total: 10,745 (2021 census)
  - Density: 5,120/km^{2} (13,250/sq mi)
- Postcode: 3031
Suburbs around Kensington
Flemington	Flemington	Parkville
Footscray	Kensington	North Melbourne
Footscray	West Melbourne	West Melbourne

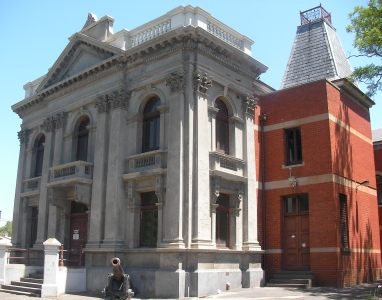
Former Kensington Town Hall, now community centre, from forecourt

Kensington is an inner-city suburb in Melbourne, Victoria, Australia, 4 km (2.5 mi) north-west of Melbourne's Central Business District, located within the City of Melbourne local government area. Kensington recorded a population of 10,745 at the 2021 census.

Kensington is known for its village ambiance, its cafes, and a diversity of architecture - including Victorian terraces, cottages, warehouse apartments and new structures in the west of the suburb. The suburb is hilly in sections and contains established tree lined streets.

The suburb is bounded by Racecourse Road to the north, Smithfield Road and the Maribyrnong River to the west, the Sunbury/Werribee railway lines to the south, and Moonee Ponds Creek to the east. Kensington was once home to one of Victoria's major abattoirs and livestock saleyards, an army ordnance depot and a number of factories. The stock yards ceased operation in 1984, prompting significant urban renewal in the area now known as Kensington Banks.

Kensington was named after Kensington in London.

== History ==
=== Settlement ===
Prior to European settlement, the area was home to the Wurundjeri people, who have lived in the area surrounding the Birrarung Valley for up to 40,000 years. They lived predominantly as hunters and gatherers, moving around the present-day City of Melbourne and its surrounds depending on changes in the weather and the availability of food.

Neighbouring Flemington was initially settled in 1839 by James Watson, who named the area after Flemington Estate in Scotland, where his father-in-law was a manager. The first land release came in 1840, when land adjacent to the Maribyrnong River was made available for cattle grazing. Kensington was part of the City of Essendon on its foundation in 1861, but later split away to form the Borough of Flemington and Kensington in 1882. The area was originally known for horse proving grounds, its cattle yards, and abattoirs.

In the late 1850s, the City of Melbourne moved its cattle yards from a location on the corner of Elizabeth and Victoria Streets to a location in the north of the suburb, near present-day Racecourse Road. The yards were completed in 1858, with the first sales held the following year. The yards' proximity to the Maribyrnong (or Saltwater) River, allowed for the discharge of liquid waste and were soon joined by factories for fellmongery, bone manure, and glue.

The abattoir and its associated factories were soon surrounded by suburbs, prompting complaints and public meetings objecting to the by-products and waste produced by the saleyards. Alfred Deakin, who represented the member for Essendon and Flemington in the Victorian Legislative Assembly until 1900, moved a division in favour of the yards' closure in 1891. Economic downturn in the 1890s, however, meant that the closure was postponed and a by-law was instead passed by the Melbourne City Council making it illegal to drive livestock through streets in Flemington and Kensington between 8am and 10pm.

The earliest land sales in the suburb included the Palace Hotel and a Wesleyan Church, both acquired in 1879. In 1886, the borough had a population of approximately 6,000, with approximately 20 new buildings opening each month. Low-lying land in the south of the suburb, near the present-day JJ Holland Park, was filled in around the same period, allowing for the construction of the Gillespie Mill adjacent to the railway line.

A railway line to Essendon was opened by the Melbourne and Essendon Railway Company in 1860, including Kensington railway station. The railway closed in 1864, but was later reopened as far as Newmarket by the Victorian Railways in November 1867. The refurbished and extended railway line also served the Newmarket cattle sale yards, which by 1888 handled more than half a million animals every year.

A railway station at South Kensington opened in March 1891.

Leopold, Victoria (an eastern suburb of Geelong) was known as Kensington until it was renamed in 1892. In 1876, people sending mail to this Kensington were advised to give "Kensington, near Flemington" as the address.

=== 20th century ===
In 1905, the Borough of Flemington and Kensington was amalgamated with the City of Melbourne.

A major railway yard adjacent to Dynon Road towards the south of the suburb was opened in 1955 to relieve congestion at existing facilities near Flinders Street and Spencer Street station. Originally built during World War II as a means of increasing railway freight capacity, the yards were extended and upgraded to include the country's longest goods depot.

=== Abattoir closure and present day ===
In November 1984, an official announcement was made that the Newmarket Saleyards would be closed the following year. Although the closure had been discussed for almost a century, economic hardship and drought conditions, as well as the decentralisation of the livestock industry and urban development affected the viability of the yards. The yards operated until 1987, when an employment trust was formed to dismantle the yards, assisted by more than 100 long-term unemployed. The yards were redeveloped by the state government under the Lynch's Bridge project, which now has approximately 6,100 residents.

In line with other inner city areas, gentrification has prompted an increase in household incomes, a greater proportion of residents aged 25–49 years old, and a shift in occupation from manufacturing to property and business services. The average household size has also decreased: in 1981, 53% of households had 1–2 persons, whereas in 2006 the proportion had increased to 70.3%.

After the proclamation of the City of Melbourne Act 1993, parts of Kensington were transferred from the City of Melbourne to the City of Essendon, which merged with Moonee Valley City Council in 1995. The restructure saw the City of Melbourne's boundary altered to extend past Flemington Racecourse to include the Melbourne Showgrounds. At the same time, parts of Kensington north of Macaulay Road, including the railway station, Kensington Town Hall, and Kensington Primary School, became part of the City of Essendon. In the 2006 census, 5,204 residents lived within the City of Melbourne boundary, with 2,865 falling under the Moonee Valley City Council.

A review of the municipal boundary in Kensington and North Melbourne was conducted in 2007, and found significant support for the entire suburb to be brought under the control of the City of Melbourne. Submission to the review highlighted issues with service provision, the lack of a coordinated retail strategy for the Macaulay Road shopping precinct, and challenges for community groups operating on both sides of the boundary. A recommendation that these areas of Kensington should be transferred to the City of Melbourne was accepted by the state government in 2008, and implemented the same year.

Four'N Twenty pies were produced in Kensington until 2003, when production moved to Bairnsdale. Suburb review site, CityHobo has called Kensington one of the best places to live in Melbourne after the area's significant gentrification. The area is considered socially progressive with a large refugee and gay community residing in Kensington.

== Culture ==
=== Politics ===
At a local government level, Kensington is part of the City of Melbourne, which also includes parts of Flemington.

In the Victorian Legislative Assembly, Kensington is part of the electoral district of Melbourne. The area is represented in the Victorian Legislative Council by members for the Northern Metropolitan Region.

At a federal level, Kensington is now part of the Division of Maribyrnong, held by Australian Labor Party member Bill Shorten since the 2007 federal election. There are two polling booths in Kensington, one at Kensington Primary School, the other at Holy Rosary School. In the 2022 Australian Federal Election Bill Shorten won the two candidate preferred vote at both booths by a significant margin, although the Greens outpolled him on first preferences at the Kensington Primary School booth. Prior to a redistribution in 2021, Kensington was part of the Division of Melbourne, held by Greens member Adam Bandt since the 2010 federal election, and by Australian Labor Party members before that since the Federation of Australia in 1901.

=== Places of worship ===
- Holy Rosary, a Roman Catholic church, is located in Gower Street and works in partnership with the St Brendan’s parish in neighbouring Flemington.
- St Mary’s Coptic Orthodox Church is located on the corner of Epsom Road and Kensington Road in a former Anglican Church building. It is the first Coptic Orthodox church in Melbourne.
- Christ Church Kensington, located in McCracken Street, is an Anglican and Uniting Church joint congregation, with Sunday services following a combination of the Anglican and Uniting Church traditions of prayer.
- The Strong Tower Assembly, located in McLennan Drive, is a congregation of the Redeemed Christian Church of God, a Nigerian Pentecostal mega church.

== Demographics ==
According to the 2021 census, Kensington had 10,745 residents. The suburb's median age was 35, with an average of 2.1 people per household, earning a median weekly income of $2,216.

A review conducted by the City of Melbourne in 2009 following the alteration of the council boundary found that the suburb's population was growing at approximately 1% per annum, amongst the slowest-growing in the municipality. Approximately 10% of residents were university students, the lowest proportion in the municipality.

The majority of residents (65.3%) were born in Australia, while approximately 29.2% spoke a language other than English at home, mostly Mandarin, Cantonese, Vietnamese, Spanish, and Somali.

The median household income for Kensington was $2,216 per week, higher than the Victoria median of $1,759. The most common occupations were professionals, managers, and clerical and administrative workers. Almost two-thirds (63%) of residents reported working full-time, and a further 27.2% worked part-time work. Unemployment was below the national average at 4.3%. Almost two-thirds (66%) of the residents worked 35 or more hours per week.

The housing composition is half and half, owned and rented, with 56.4% of all households being families, and 34.9% being single person households. Kensington has the highest concentration of couples with children in the City of Melbourne.

== Built environment ==
=== Housing ===
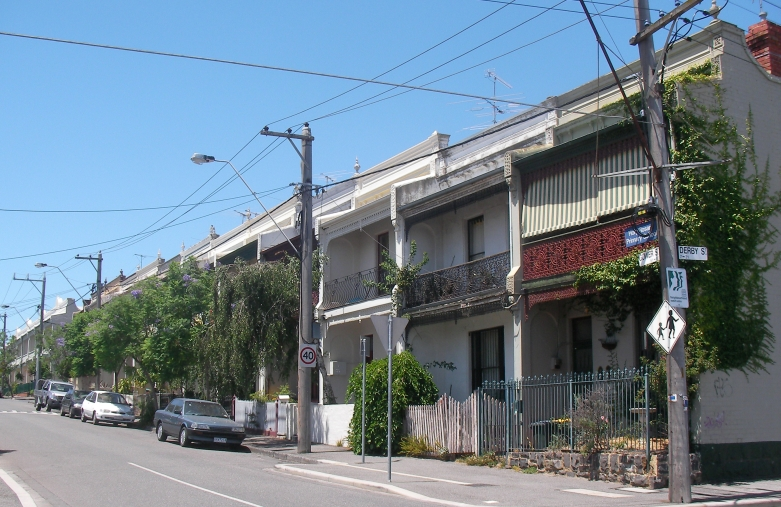
Victorian terrace houses marching up Gower Street. All of these boom style terraces were built in 1888

Kensington's housing is primarily medium density, a mix of semi-detached row or terrace houses, apartments, and public housing. At the time of the 2021 census, there were 5,547 private dwellings in the suburb, and 88.3% of dwellings were occupied. The average number of bedrooms per dwelling (2.4) is lower than the state average. The median rent in the suburb is $416 per week.

The suburb's residential areas are primarily concentrated towards its west, with a number of well-preserved Victorian and Edwardian timber and brick terraces along Ormond Street, McCracken Street, Rankins Road, Bellair Street, Lambeth Street and Parsons Street. The development of the Kensington Banks project following the closure of the Newmarket Saleyards has increased the share of residential property in the area.

The Housing Commission of Victoria established public housing estate in the suburb in the 1960s. A$150 million redevelopment of the estate was completed in 2012, and included the refurbishment of 217 existing units, in addition to 210 new public housing units, 417 private apartments and 15 social housing units. A high-rise tower and a number of walk-up blocks were demolished as part of the development.

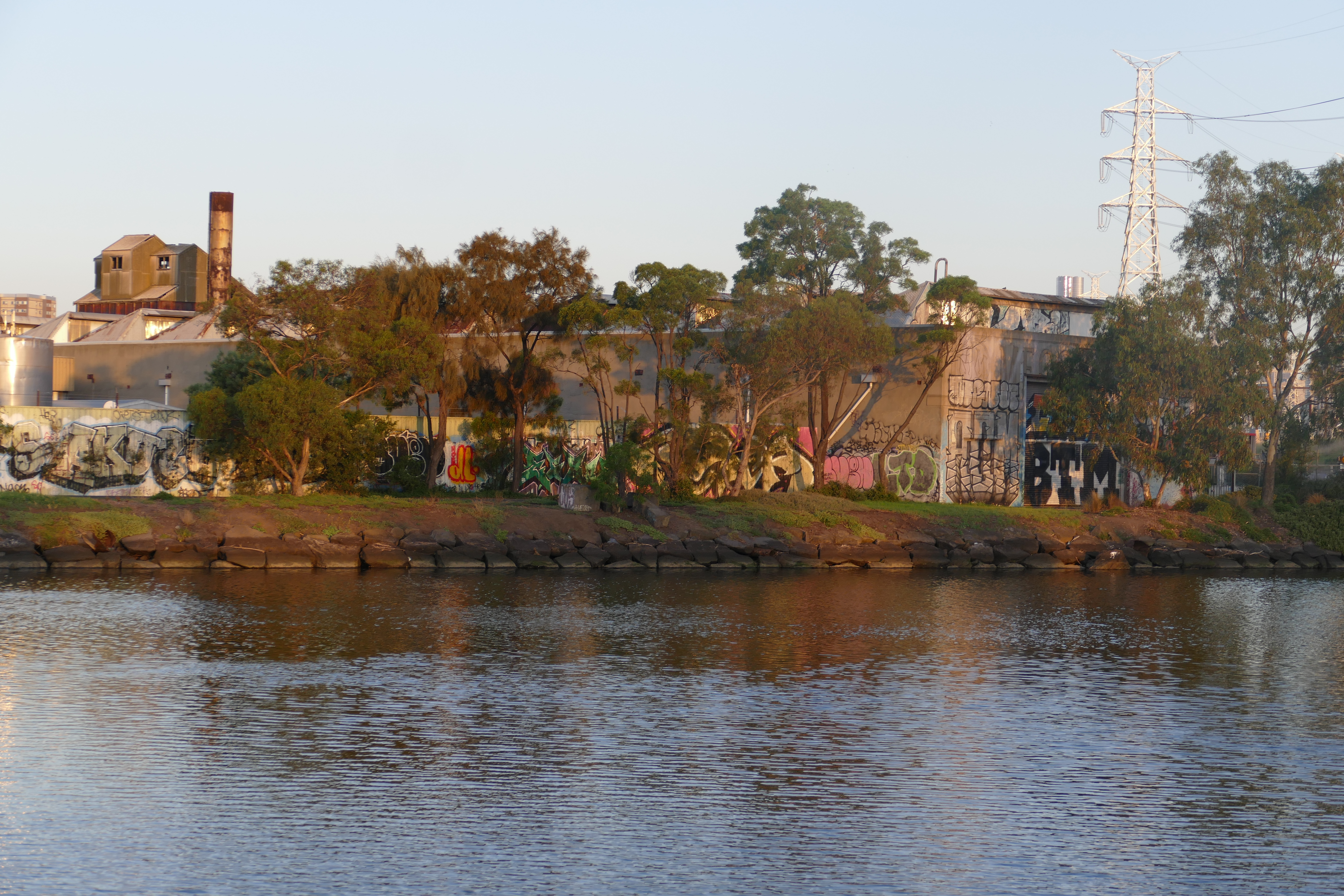
Maribyrnong river in Kensington in 2019

=== Parks and public open spaces ===
The major recreational area is J.J. Holland Park, adjacent to South Kensington railway station.

The Kensington Banks redevelopment has provided a second major public park on the Maribyrnong River frontage. The new residential areas have been planned around a series of smaller-scaled open spaces, one of which is notable as the Women's Peace Park, to the west of Epsom Road. The open space spine formed by the stockman's route passes under Epsom Road and continues up to Racecourse Road.

In June 2016, the Melbourne City Council created a park next to Kensington Station, by expanding an existing reserve at Eastwood Street and Rankins Road, which effectively doubled the amount of green space.

== Education and schools ==
Kensington Primary School was opened by Alfred Deakin in 1881 and initially offered places for 250 students. The new school cost £1,800, and was later expanded to accommodate a further 100 students. A Catholic primary school, Holy Rosary, opened at the parish hall in 1916, moving to its present location in 1927.

Kensington Community High School opened in the Lynch's Bridge area in 1975.

== Transport ==
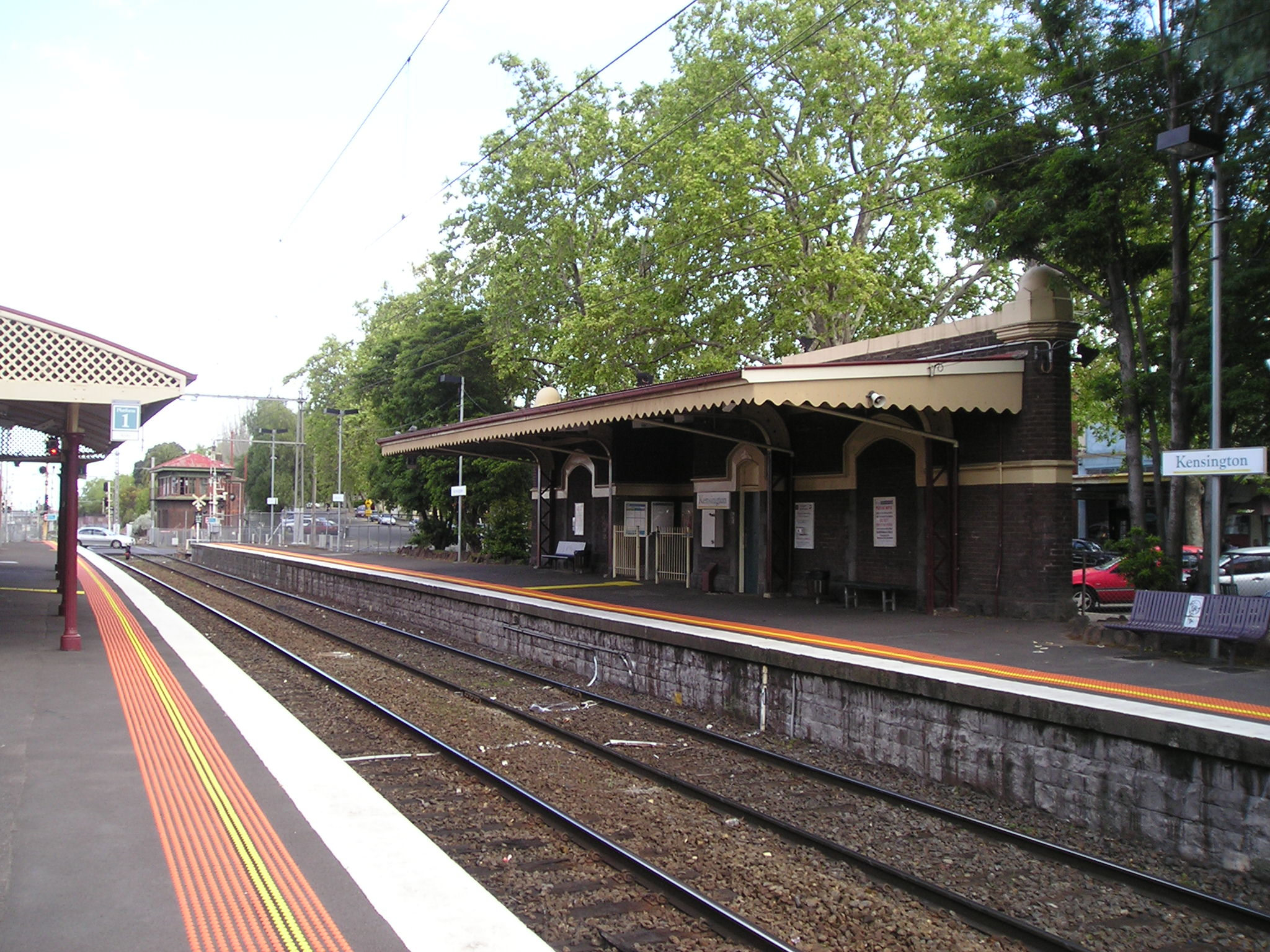
Kensington Railway Station

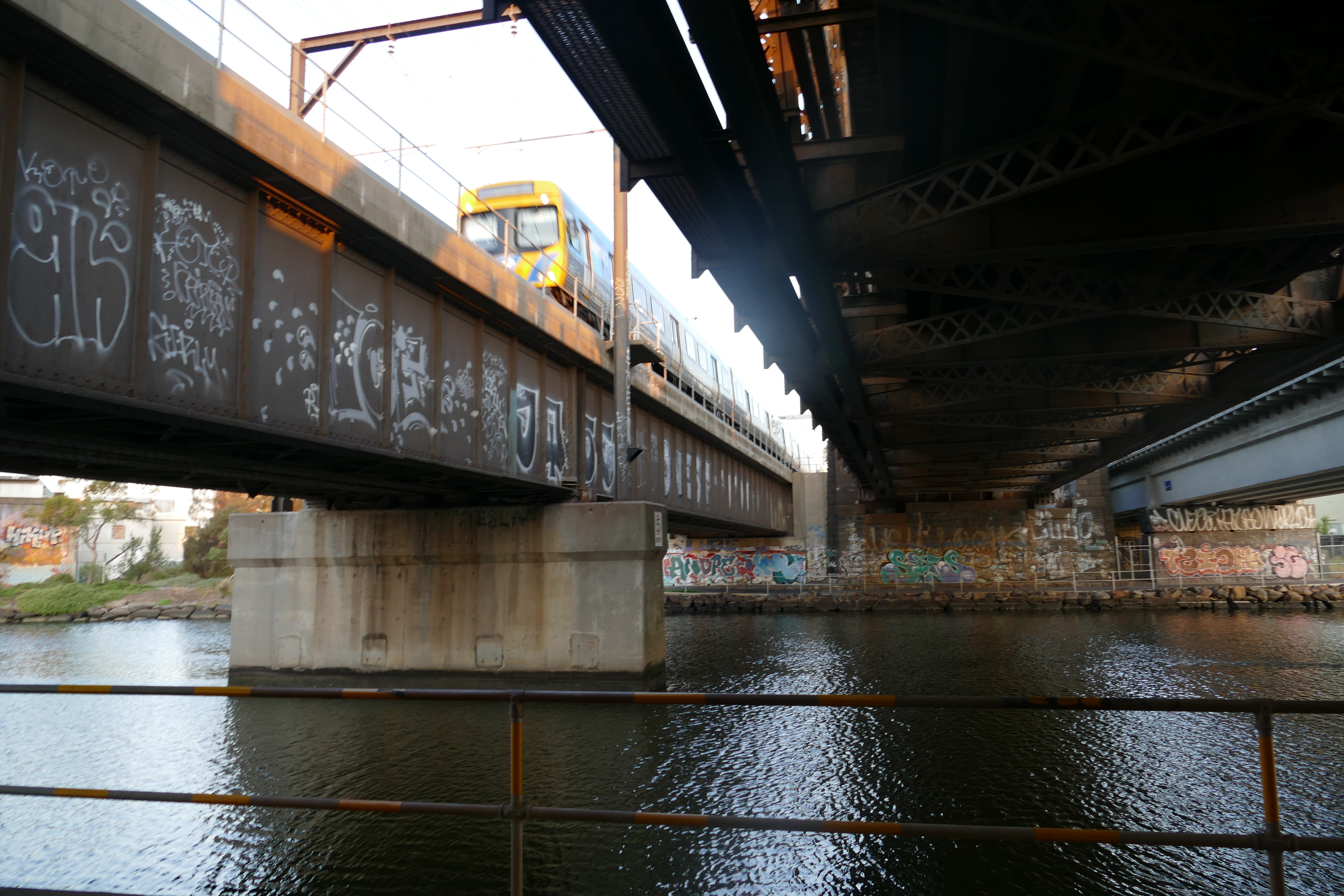
Railway bridges over the Maribyrnong river in Kensington in 2019

Smithfield Road, part of the Princes Highway is the main road through the suburb, located to the north. Racecourse Road forms the suburb's northern boundary. Epsom Road and Kensington Road run north east and south east respectively, forming a junction with Macaulay Road, the main arterial which links Kensington central to Melbourne in the east. Another main road, Stubbs Street, runs along the industrial western banks of the Moonee Ponds Creek.

Three train stations service Kensington. Kensington station, on the Craigieburn railway line, offers frequent service to Craigieburn and to Flinders Street, generally via the City Loop. South Kensington is served by trains on the Werribee and Williamstown lines, the Sunbury line runs express through the station. Macaulay, on the Upfield Line, is on the suburb's eastern boundary. Tram route 57 runs along the northern edge of Kensington, through Racecourse Road.

There are two bus routes: the 402, which runs along Macaulay and Kensington Roads, and the 404 which runs along Smithfield and Epsom Roads.

== See also ==
- City of Essendon – Parts of Kensington were previously within this former local government area.
- City of Moonee Valley – Parts of Kensington were previously within this local government area.
- City of Melbourne – Kensington is located within this local government area.
- Flemington, Victoria
