= Patties Foods =

Australian food manufacturing company

Patties Food Group
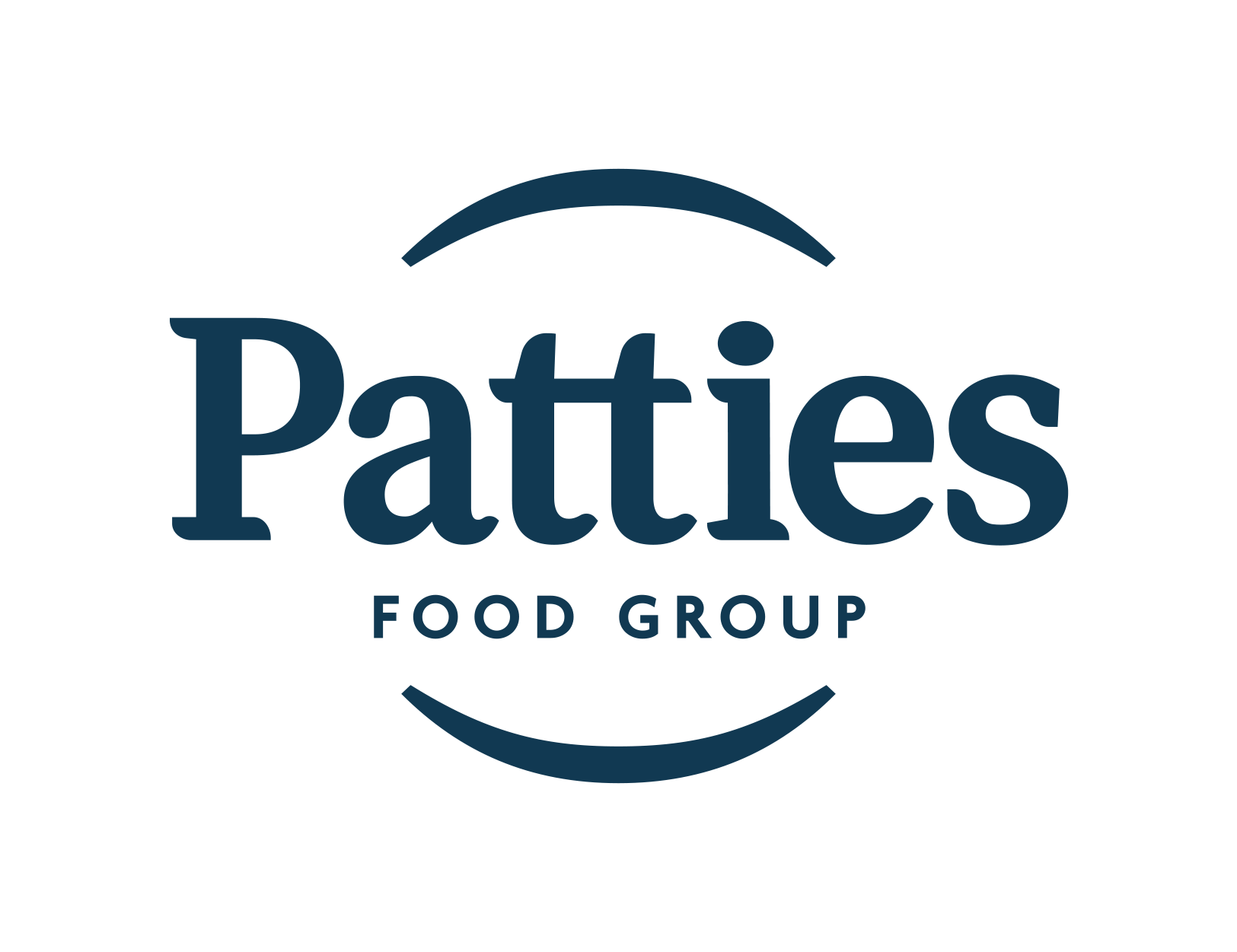
- Type: Subsidiary
- Industry: Food
- Founded: 1966
- Founder: Rijs family
- Headquarters: Bairnsdale, Australia
- Area served: Australia, New Zealand, USA, Japan, Singapore, Thailand. Taiwan, South Korea.
- Key people: Paul Hitchcock (CEO)
- Products: Meat pies Pastries baked goods frozen fruits and desserts Pre Prepared Meals
- Parent: PAG
- Divisions: Four'n Twenty; Patties; Herbert Adams; Nanna's; Chefs Pride; Snowy River; Lean Cuisine; Fitness Outcomes; Ruffie Rustic Foods; On The Menu
- Website: pattiesfoodgroup.com

Patties Foods, is an Australian food manufacturing company that produces meat pies, baked goods, frozen fruits, and pre-made desserts. Patties Foods is represented in the Australian market by the Four'n Twenty, Patties, Herbert Adams, Nanna's, Chefs Pride, Boscastle and Snowy River brands. Patties is the largest Meat pie producing company in Australia, and the world. They are the producers of several well-known Meat pies, including the Patties, Snowy River pie, Herbert Adams pie, and as of 2003, Four'n Twenty pies. Patties Foods is headquartered in Bairnsdale, Victoria.

== History ==
Patties Foods was founded as Patties Bakeries. Originally a cake shop in Lakes Entrance, in August 1966 Patties Bakery, originally named for the owner's wife Patty Neat, was purchased by Peter and Annie Rijs, whom emigrated from the Netherlands in 1956. In 1967 the Rijs family began to build business by introducing pies and bread rolls. The demand for Patties' product increased, prompting a series of shops and bakeries to be built, bought and sold. In 1985 a new factory was built and production was moved to Bairnsdale, where it continues to this day.

The business continued to expand over the years, Patties began distribution in Melbourne in 1986, and in 1995 exporting to New Zealand. In 1993, Patties launched Arriba, a Mexican food range. In 1996, after pastry sales grew, Patties sold its bread business to Sunicrust in order to concentrate on pastry products. Demand for pastry products continued to grow, resulting in significant expansions to the factory. In 1998, a two million dollar plant renovation and extension took place, including installation of a spiral freezer. In 2000, a new parallel manufacturing line, capable of making all pasties, sausage rolls and finger foods, was installed, substantially increasing capacity.

Australian brands Four'n Twenty, Herbert Adams and Nanna's were purchased from Simplot in 2003 and Patties began manufacturing the associated products in the Bairnsdale factory in 2004. In 2006, Patties was inducted into the Victorian Manufacturing Hall of Fame and the Gippsland Business Awards Hall of Fame.

Patties Foods was publicly listed on the Australian Securities Exchange in 2006. The Rijs brothers, sons of the founding Mr and Mrs Rijs, retained 40% shareholding of the company. In 2007 Patties acquired the Chefs Pride and Creative Gourmet businesses, and introduced gluten free foods to its product roster.

In early 2015 a recall was ordered on Nanna's frozen berries which had been imported from China and Chile, after five people contracted hepatitis A. In November 2016 Patties was purchased by Pacific Equity Partners and delisted from the ASX. In September 2022 Patties was sold to PAG.

== Brands and product lines ==
=== Patties Pies ===
Pies, pasties, sausage rolls and quiches in three different sizes (standard, party and mini party), there is also a gluten free range of patties pies and a vegan roll.

=== Four'n Twenty ===
Pies, including the 'traveller pie', pasties and sausage rolls.

=== Wedgewood ===
Pies, party pies and sausage rolls.

=== Nanna's ===
Frozen fruit, family and snack sized fruit pies, waffles, danishes, crumbles and jam filled donuts.

=== Herbert Adams ===
A range of gourmet pies, pasties and sausage rolls.

=== Snowy River ===
Pies, pasties and sausage rolls in two different sizes (standard and party).

=== Patties Foodservice ===
A range of bistro items, desserts, finger foods, fruits, vegetable and specialty items which are supplied to hotels, restaurants and other leading hospitality establishments.
