= Four'n Twenty =

Australian brand of meat pies and sausage rolls

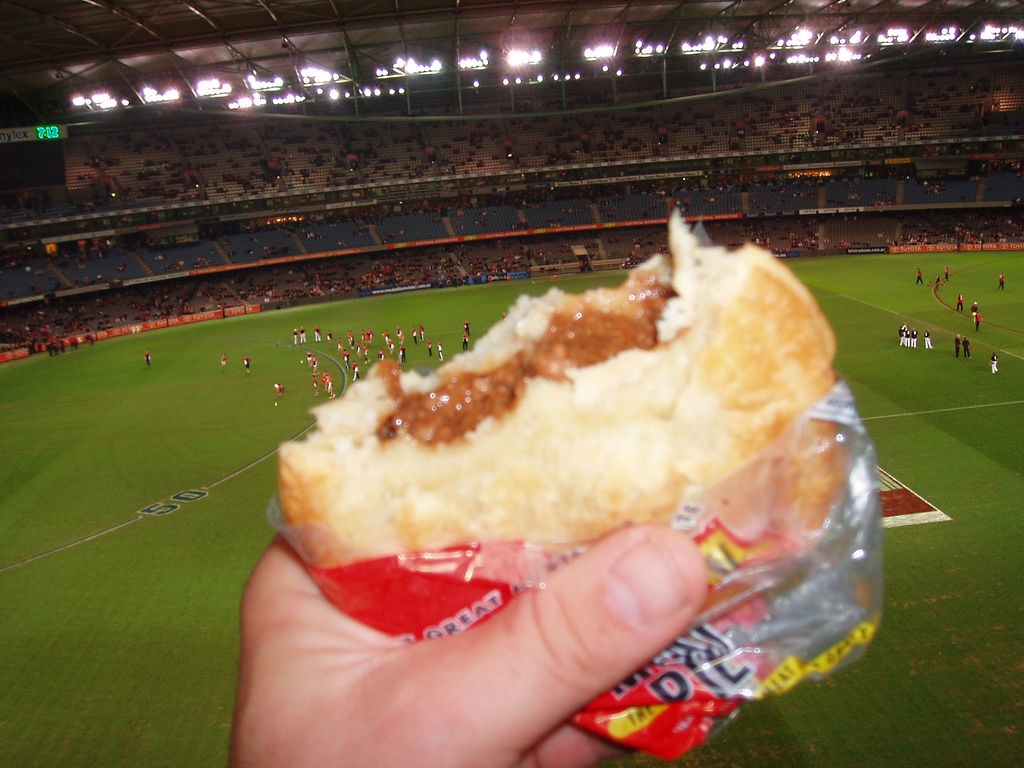
- A Four'n Twenty Pie being eaten during an AFL match
- Product type: Meat pies Sausage rolls
- Current owner: Patties Foods
- Country: Australia
- Introduced: 1947
- Markets: Australia; New Zealand; United States; Japan
- Previous owners: Peters Ice Cream; Simplot
- Tagline: The great Australian taste
- Website: fourntwenty.com.au

Four'n Twenty is an Australian pastry brand, now distributed internationally, with products including meat pies and sausage rolls. It is owned by parent company Patties Foods.

The classic Four'n Twenty pie is filled with mutton and beef (a minimum of 25%, per Food Standards Australia New Zealand regulations), mostly shoulder meat, in a spiced gravy with carrot and onion. The crust is a flour and margarine shortcrust pastry, with the upper crust additionally rolled and folded to make it slightly flaky. Other fillings include chicken and vegetable, pulled pork, and grass-fed Angus beef.

Australians have the highest per-capita meat pie consumption in the world, and Four'n Twenty pies are considered iconic, particularly in the context of football matches. They are often served with tomato sauce.

== Etymology and logos ==
The brand's name is a reference to the traditional English nursery rhyme Sing a Song of Sixpence, which includes the lyric "Four and twenty blackbirds / Baked in a pie". Some early logos alluded to this, with 24 blackbirds escaping from a pie and taking flight, although the current logo features only text.

== History ==
The Four'n Twenty pie was created in Bendigo, Victoria, Australia by Leslie Thompson McClure in 1947. Initially called the Dad & Dave Pie after the name of his cafe, McClure renamed the pie using the nursery rhyme suggestion from an employee. At that time, production was around 50 pies per day.

McClure took a sampling of his pies to the Royal Melbourne Agricultural Show, where they proved very popular. Increasing demand for the pie caused McClure to open a bakery in a pavilion of the showgrounds in 1949, then a factory in nearby Union Road, Ascot Vale in 1953, and eventually a larger factory in Kensington.

In 1960, McClure sold his stake in Four'n Twenty to the Victorian arm of Peters Ice Cream. Peters' subsequent owner, Pacific Dunlop, sold the brand to Simplot in 1995, and Simplot in turn sold Four'n Twenty and several other bakery brands to Patties Foods in 2003. Patties expanded their Bairnsdale manufacturing facility and consolidated Four'n Twenty production into it, closing the Kensington plant. The new plant can produce 21,000 pies per hour, 24 hours per day.

In 2014, a halal certified "Export" variation of the Four'n Twenty meat pie sparked social media complaints and calls for a boycott of the product.

== International presence ==
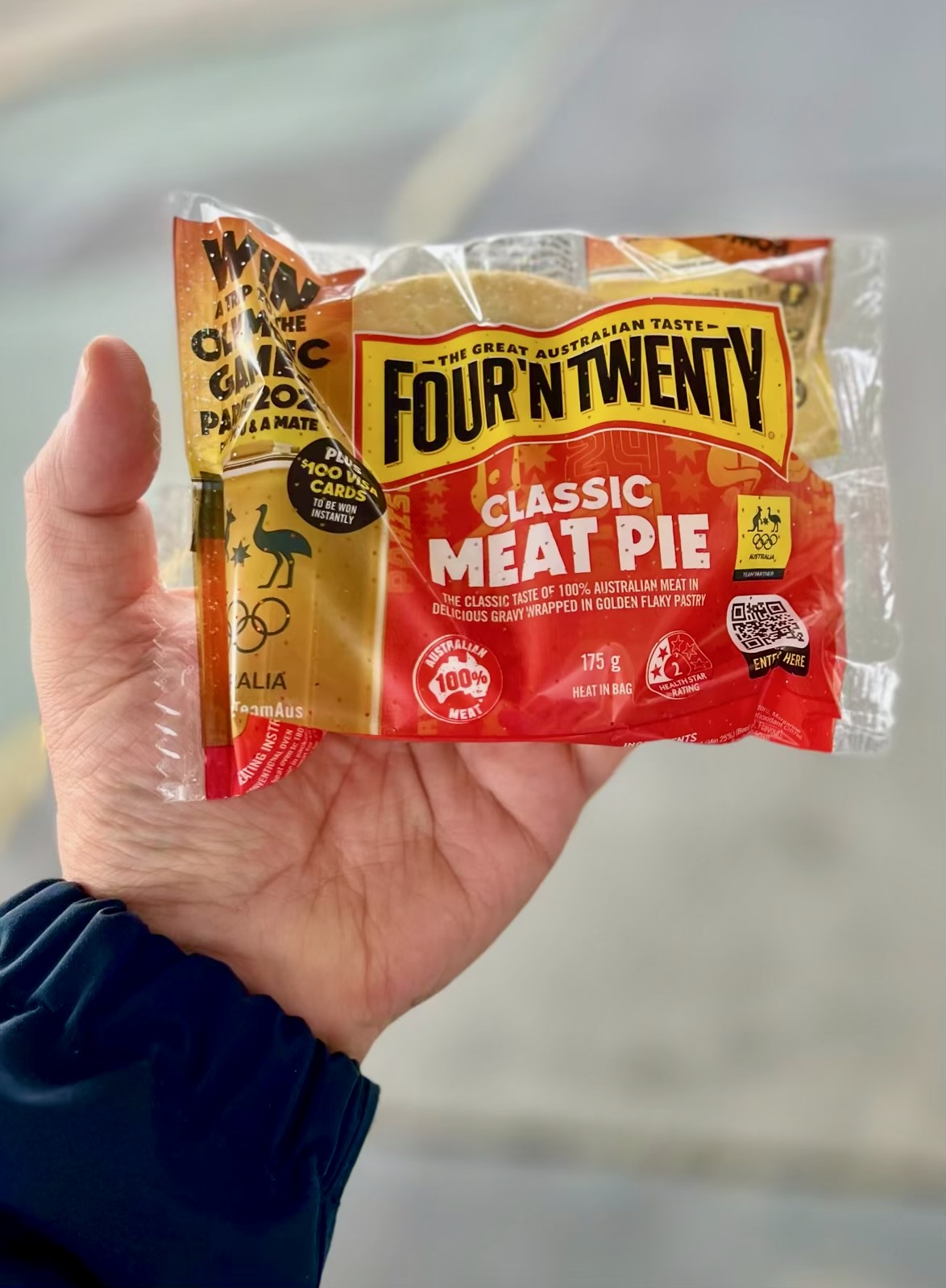
Four'n Twenty pie, with Olympic sponsorship on packaging

In 2006, the brand announced that the Four'n Twenty pie would be sold on the American market.

On 21 April 2019, Four'n Twenty launched its brand of meat pies in Japan, with a Four’n Twenty Day celebration at the World Beer Museum in Tokyo.

Along with Milo, Weet-Bix and Vegemite, Four’n Twenty pies are an official provision to the 2024 Australian Olympic Team.

== Varieties ==
In 2017, to celebrate Four'n Twenty's 70th anniversary, the brand launched the Four'n Twenty Cheese and Vegemite Pie.

Later in 2017, Four'n Twenty launched the Topper, a crispy breaded pocket with lasagna, macaroni and cheese, or chicken cordon bleu fillings.

In 2020, Four'n Twenty introduced a vegan-friendly meat-free pie to the market, said to have the same "taste, texture and flavour" as the original.

In 2021, Four'n Twenty launched the Butter Chicken Pie, featuring a butter chicken-style spiced filling with chicken, tomato, and chilli.

In 2025, CC's Corn Chips and Four'n Twenty collaborated to release the Beef & CC's Nacho Cheese Pie, a limited-edition pie available frozen from supermarkets and hot from pie warmers at petrol stations and convenience stores.

== See also ==
- Australian meat pie
- Lihapiirakka
