= Harry's Cafe de Wheels =

Movable food cart in Sydney, NSW

Coordinates: 33°52′09″S 151°13′16″E

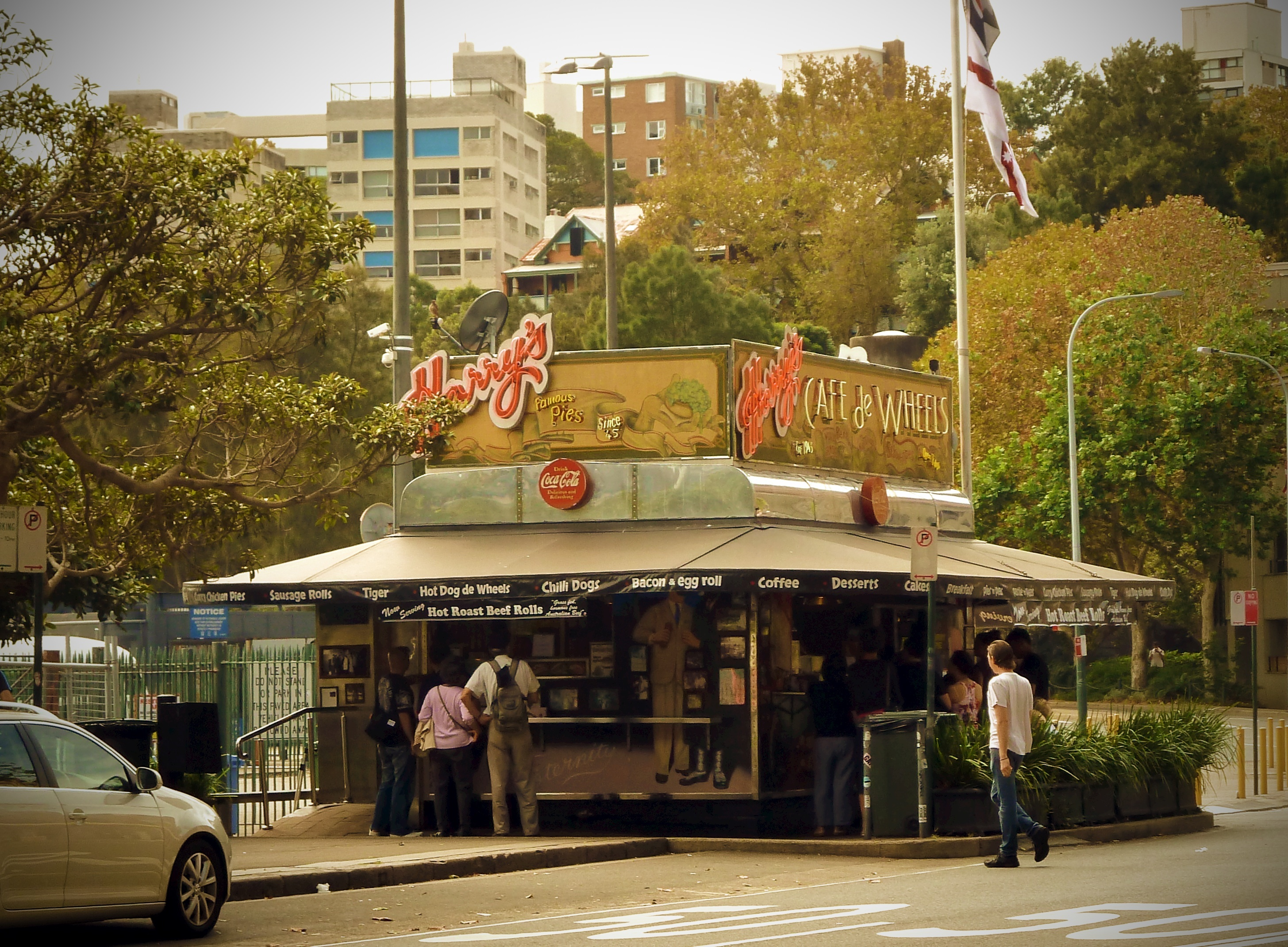
- Type: Take Away – (pie cart)
- Industry: Food service
- Founded: 1936; 90 years ago
- Founder: Harry "Tiger" Edwards
- Headquarters: Ultimo, New South Wales, Australia
- Products: Take Away – (pie cart)
- Website: www.harryscafedewheels.com.au

Harry's Cafe de Wheels is an iconic pie cart located on Cowper Wharf Road in Woolloomooloo, Sydney, Australia, near the Finger Wharf and Fleet Base East.

They are best known for their dish "Tiger Pie", an Australian meat pie topped with mashed potato, mushy peas and gravy; it was named after the pie cart's founder Harry "Tiger" Edwards.

Other Harry's Cafe de Wheels operate in Baulkham Hills, Liverpool, Newcastle (using a converted Sydney R-Class Tram), Parramatta, Penrith, St. Marys, Tempe and Woodbine.

== Description ==
Harry's Cafe de Wheels was a moveable food van, similar to those found at funfairs, with a hung awning. It has been moved a number of times in its history but the van is now permanently fixed on a masonry base. The caravan walls have been decorated with custom painted murals by Alan Puckett, a motoring art specialist. The inside walls of the cart are decorated with pictures and murals of famous visitors.

The site is considered a Sydney icon and an institution in the local area. The significance of the location is reflected by its inclusion on the New South Wales National Trust register.

The 1945 version of Harry's Pie Cart, retired after 40 years of use, is now located in the Powerhouse Museum collection.

Harry's pies are supplied from Hannah's Pies, its factory in the inner city suburb of Ultimo.

== History ==
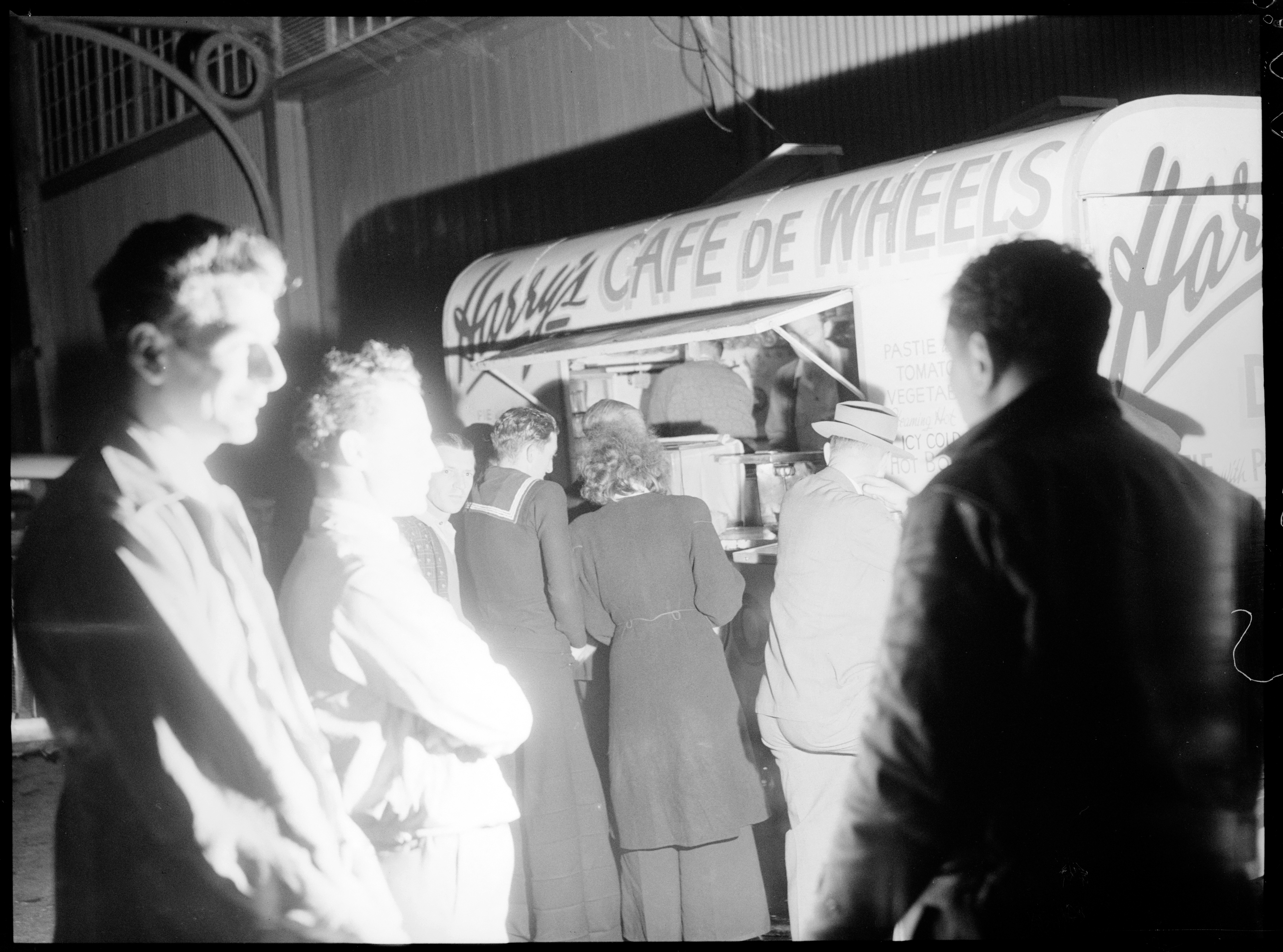
Harry's Cafe de Wheels, Woolloomooloo, Sydney, 1949

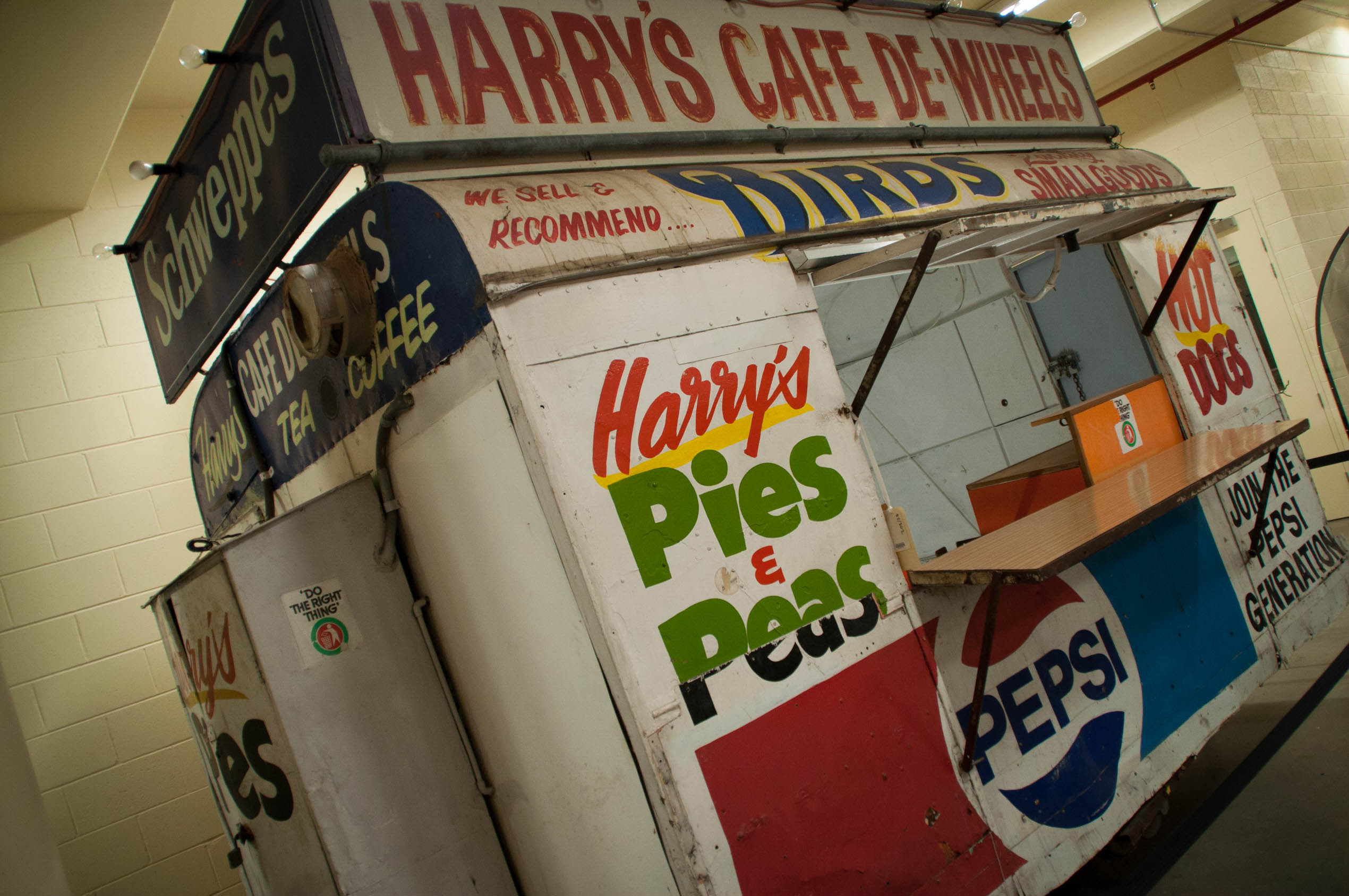
Harry's Cafe de Wheels c.1945 at Powerhouse Museum

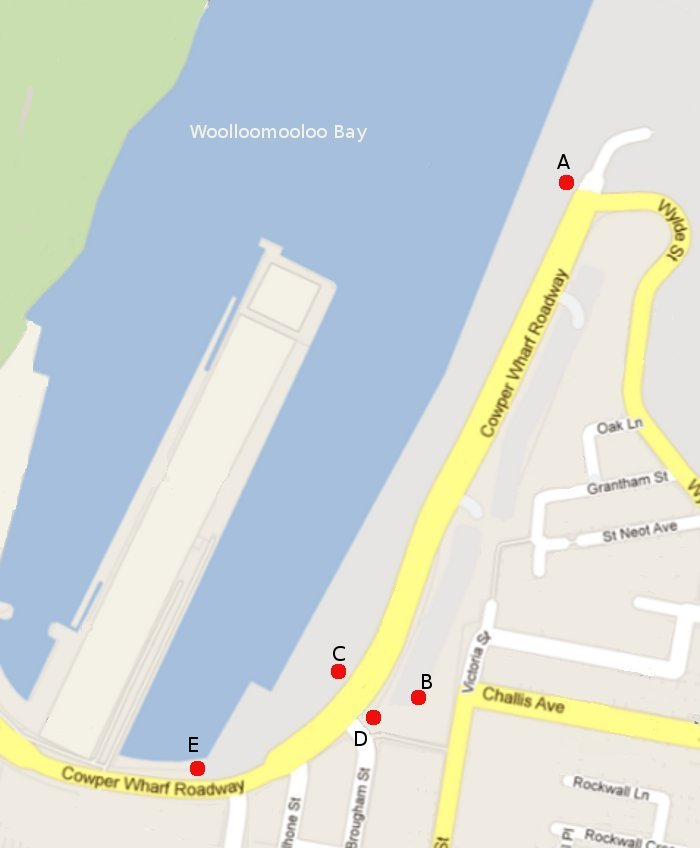
Historical locations of Harry's Cafe de Wheels on Cowper Wharf Road, Woolloomooloo. A:1938–39, 1945–81. B:1981–82. C:1983–84. D:1985–91. E:1991–present day. Note: Map shows current position of Cowper Wharf Road. The 1981–82 location was on the footpath of Cowper Wharf Road before the road was relocated further west in 1982.

Harry "Tiger" Edwards opened the original caravan cafe, named simply Harry's, near the gates of the Woolloomooloo Naval Yard in 1936. He served with the Second Australian Imperial Force in World War II, during which time the cafe was not operational. The cart re-opened upon his return from the war in 1945.

The name Cafe de Wheels came about because of the requirement from the city council that mobile food caravans had to move a minimum of 12 inches (30 cm) each day. The cart has been moved to various locations on Cowper Wharf Road, mostly due to re-development work in the Woolloomooloo Bay area. Local legend tells that the name was temporarily changed to Cafe de Axle at one point when the wheels were stolen.

As the years passed, 'Harry's Cafe de Wheels' gained new fame as a tourist attraction. A visit to the caravan became a 'must' for visiting celebrities such as Frank Sinatra, Robert Mitchum and Marlene Dietrich. In 1974, Colonel Sanders stopped at Harry's and enjoyed the food so much that he ate three 'pies and peas' while leaning on his walking stick in front of the caravan. A picture of Sanders taken during the visit still hangs in the caravan today.

Harry's specialises today in the same basic food that was popular back in the 1940s, such as pies and mushy peas. During the 1970s Harry's introduced hot dogs, mostly to appease the American sailors.

== Menu ==
The pies and hotdogs available on the menu include:

- The famous Tiger pie and its variations (Bacon and Cheese Tiger, Veggie Tiger)
- Pie and peas
- Seafood pie
- Hot dog with veggies
- Hot dog de wheels
- Chilli dog

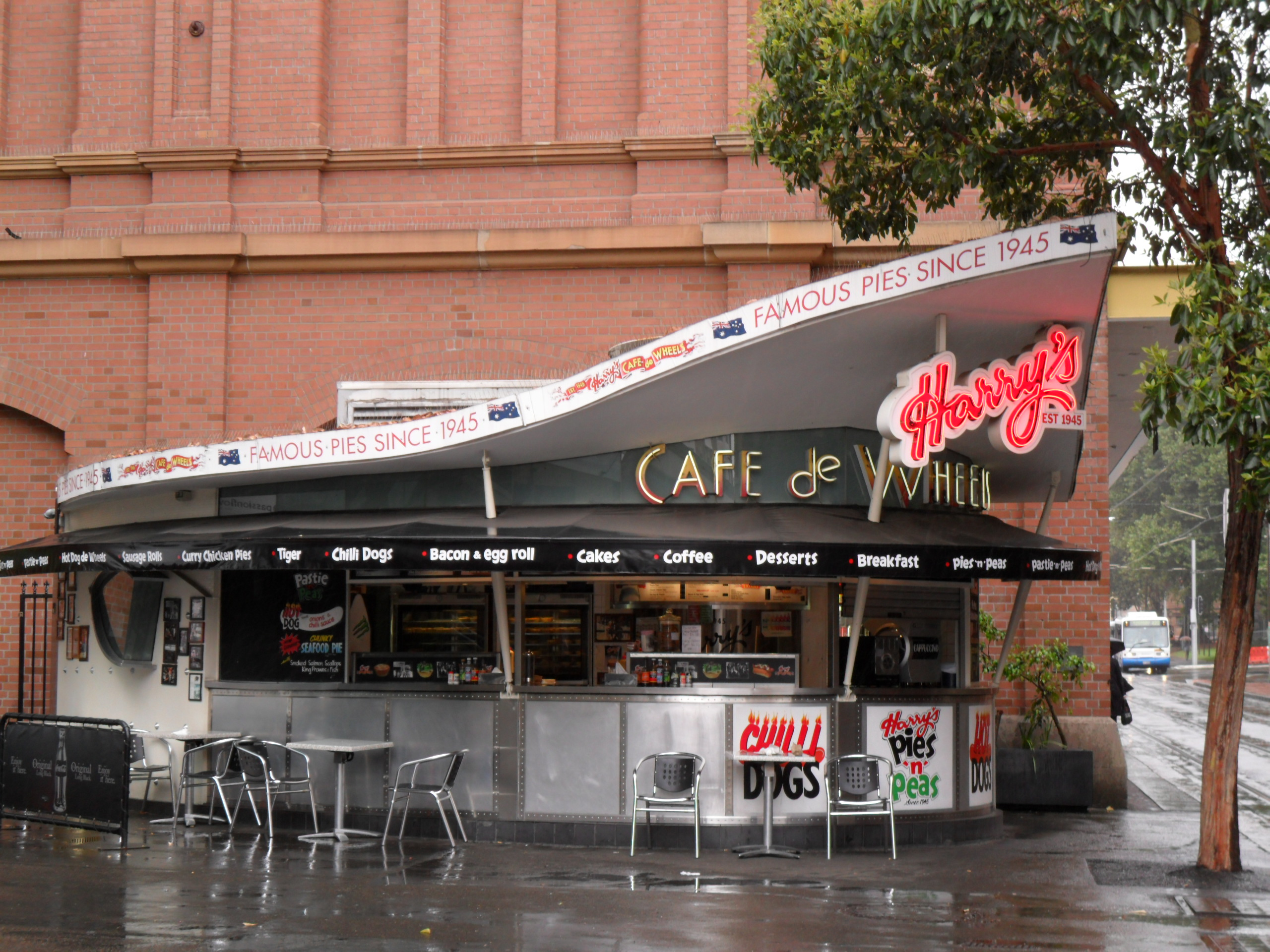
Hay Street, Haymarket kiosk behind the Capitol Theatre

== In popular culture ==
- Australian singer Peter Blakeley named his 1989 album Harry's Cafe de Wheels with a photo on the cover.
- The cafe was featured in the second season of the reality television show The Amazing Race in 2002 as the site of a Fast Forward challenge where one team had to eat two meat pies. It was also featured on the first season of HaMerotz LaMillion, the Israeli version of The Amazing Race.
- It was featured on the Sydney episode of Bizarre Foods with Andrew Zimmern on the Travel Channel.
- It was featured in season 2, episode 11 of television series The Bachelor, where contestant Laurina bemoaned receiving a "dirty street pie".
