= Gillian Armstrong =

Australian film director (born 1950)

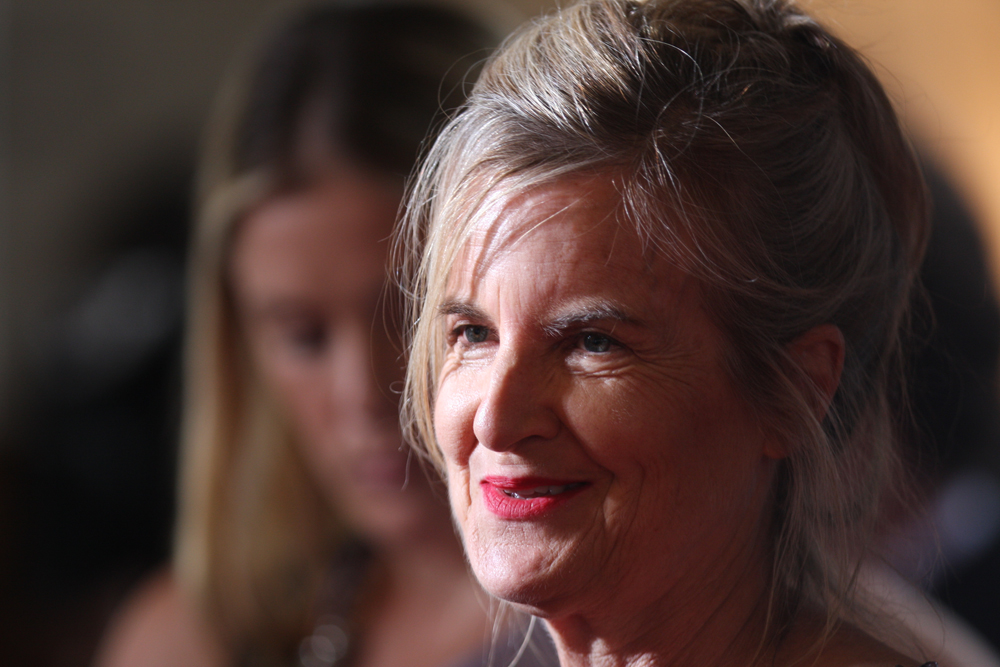
- Armstrong in 2012
- Born: Gillian May Armstrong; 18 December 1950 (age 75); Melbourne, Victoria, Australia
- Occupation: Film director
- Years active: 1970–present
- Spouse: John Pleffer
- Children: 2
- Awards: AACTA Award for Best Direction; 1979 My Brilliant Career

Gillian May Armstrong (born 18 December 1950) is an Australian feature film and documentary director, best known for My Brilliant Career (1979), Mrs. Soffel (1984), High Tide (1987), The Last Days of Chez Nous (1992), and Little Women (1994). She is a Member of the Order of Australia. She has won many film awards, including an AFI Best Director Award, has been nominated for numerous others, and is the holder of several honorary doctorates.

== Early life and education ==
Gillian May Armstrong was born on 18 December 1950 in Melbourne, Victoria. She was the middle child of a local real estate agent father and a primary school teacher mother who stopped outside work to rear a family.

She grew up in the suburb of Vermont, and attended Vermont High School. Her father was a frustrated photographer who wasn't allowed to follow his dreams professionally, yet continued his practice as an amateur. Armstrong reminisces that she grew up in a dark room, learning all about photography. When she first decided to go to art school, Armstrong didn't have a very firm grasp on what she wanted to do. Armstrong said that her parents were always very supportive of her hopes and dreams, which was not always true for women in the 1960s and 70s.

She studied general art in her first year and then majored in film, spending four years at Swinburne Technical College from 1968, which had recently established the beginnings of the Swinburne Film and Television School within the Graphic Art School. (Note: Swinburne Film and Television School, launched in 1966, offered the first tertiary course in filmmaking in the country, Part of what was the Graphic Art School at Swinburne became Film and Television.) Originally, she wanted to become set and costume designer, but ended up majoring in filmmaking after becoming interested in films. At the college, then an art school, she saw a range of artistic films, different from the commercial cinema and television she was used to.

After working for a year as an assistant editor in a commercial film house, she applied for a place on the one-year postgraduate directors course offered under a pilot training scheme at the newly created national film school, the Australian Film and Television School (now AFTRS) in 1973. Only 12 students were selected, and they were "really tested as directors". Two films that she made there won several awards, and one was screened at an international student film festival. She went overseas with the film, and then travelled around for 18 months.

She started her studies before the Australian film industry had developed. She recalls that when new films were released, the actors sounded strange; for the first time their accents were Australian rather than American.

== Career ==
Following a string of short films and documentaries, Armstrong achieved her first directorial recognition through her first full-length film The Singer and the Dancer, shot on 16 mm film, which won the best narrative film award at the 1976 Sydney Film Festival.

Armstrong became a film director at the age of 27. During the time of the development of Australian Cinema, Armstrong recalled in a Washington Post interview that tremendous tax breaks led to a frightful overproduction. Everybody was interested in doing deals and even stockbrokers were becoming directors. However, very few of them had the commitment to cinema that Armstrong and others had, and the films would be shown for a week or two, or not released at all. After Armstrong's second film My Brilliant Career, she had offers from Hollywood but quickly turned them all down, preferring to stay in Australia to make a deliberately small film called Starstruck. After the release of Starstruck, Armstrong went around giving interviews dressed in a large fuzzy blue sweater dress decorated with coloured beads, a black-and-white polka dot blouse, black tights and blue suede shoes all topped by a punk shag haircut.

Following this success, Armstrong was commissioned by the South Australian Film Corporation to make a documentary exploring the lives of young teenage girls living in Adelaide, South Australia. This became Smokes and Lollies (1976), her first paid job as director.

Armstrong's own interest in the girls led her to revisit them at ages 18, 26, 33 and 48, resulting in four more films in the style of the popular Up Series. These are Fourteen's Good, Eighteen's Better (1980), Bingo, Bridesmaids and Braces (1988), Not Fourteen Again (1996) and the most recent film, Love, Lust & Lies (2009).

Armstrong's first feature-length film My Brilliant Career (1979), an adaptation of Miles Franklin's novel of the same name, was the first Australian feature-length film to be directed by a woman for 46 years. Armstrong received six awards at the 1979 Australian Film Awards (previously the Australian Film Institute Awards, or AFI's) including Best Director. The film also brought considerable attention to its two main stars, Judy Davis and Sam Neill who were relatively unknown at the time. Following the success of My Brilliant Career, which was nominated for an Academy Award in Best Costume Design, Armstrong directed the Australian rock-musical Starstruck, which proved her ability to tackle more contemporary and experimental subject matter and styles.

She has directed a number of rock music videos in the early 1980s, including 1984's "Bop Girl" by Pat Wilson, which featured Nicole Kidman.

Since then, Armstrong has specialised in period drama. She was the first foreign woman to be approached by the American film company MGM to finance her direction of a big-budget feature, which became Mrs. Soffel (1984) starring Mel Gibson and Diane Keaton. This film tells the true story of an affair between a prisoner and a prison warden's wife, and was relatively well received by audiences and critics.

On returning to Australia, Armstrong continued to make both documentaries and feature films. She earned great recognition for High Tide (1987) and The Last Days of Chez Nous (1992), for which she was nominated for Best Director at the 1987 and 1992 Australian Film Institute Awards (AFIs). The Last Days of Chez Nous also earned her a nomination at the Berlin Film Festival. Despite this, both films were largely unrecognised internationally

In 1994, Armstrong achieved her greatest Hollywood success with the adaptation of Little Women, starring Winona Ryder, Susan Sarandon, Gabriel Byrne, Christian Bale, Claire Danes and Kirsten Dunst. This adaptation of Louisa May Alcott's novel was one of the most popular films of the year, and emphasised Armstrong's focus on portraying the intimate lives of strong female characters and their relationships with one another.

She followed this success three years later with the film Oscar and Lucinda (1997), starring Ralph Fiennes and a relatively unknown Cate Blanchett. This film, based on the novel by Australian writer Peter Carey, tells the story of a mismatched love affair in 19th-century Australia. It received mixed reviews both locally and internationally, despite its high production value and strong performances by the film main actors.

In the 2000s, Armstrong went on to direct the feature films Charlotte Gray (2001), starring Cate Blanchett, and Death Defying Acts (2008), starring Catherine Zeta-Jones and Guy Pearce. Based on the novel by Sebastian Faulks, Charlotte Gray is another of Armstrong's films that centres around a strong female protagonist.

Removed from Armstrong's usual subject matter, Death Defying Acts portrays a moment in the life of 1920s escape artist Harry Houdini in the style of a supernatural, romantic thriller. It received a modest earnings at the box office, and was part of a special screening at the 2007 Toronto International Film Festival

Despite the success of these more commercial films, it was Armstrong's lesser-known documentary Unfolding Florence: The Many Lives of Florence Broadhurst (2006), which earned her the most critical recognition during this time, and a nomination for the Grand Jury Prize at the Sundance Film Festival.

== Film themes and style ==
=== Themes ===
Armstrong has voiced her desire to reach a wide audience in her interviews, one that includes both men and women of all nationalities. However, her work continually addresses sexual politics and family tensions. Films focused on the escape and struggle with traditional sex roles and its related drawbacks and progressions such as One hundred a Day, My Brilliant Career, High Tide, and Oscar and Lucinda continue to reflect the theme. Furthermore, many people have called her a creator of "strong females" but she insists that she is simply making films about complex characters and the choices that they make.

=== Style ===
Armstrong has a distinctive style in her work that resists easy categorisation. Most of her films cannot simply be stated as being either "women's films" or Australian ones which are the two most generalised categories for women in her line of work. Armstrong's films are described as mixing and intermingling genres in ways that recreate them as something vastly different than what they have been considered. Nevertheless, the films that Armstrong creates can also be considered conventional films in their appeal to the audience. Her films possess sensitive and delicate cinematography, fluid editing, an evocative feel for setting and costume, and a commitment to solid character development and acting. According to film scholar Gwendolyn Audrey Foster, Armstrong has a "strong feminist bent" and a "mordant sense of humor".

== Personal life ==
As of 2015 Armstrong is married to John Pleffer, and they have two daughters.

== Recognition and awards ==
Armstrong is a Member of the Order of Australia, "In recognition of service to the film industry".

She has won many awards, including an AFI Best Director Award, and has been nominated for numerous other awards, including a Palme D'Or and two Golden Bear Awards. She has received multiple hdoctorates, including an honorary doctor of letters from University of Sydney, and an honorary doctorate from Swinburne University of Technology.

=== Film awards and nominations ===
| Year | Award | Category | Film | Result | Notes |
|---|---|---|---|---|---|
| 1979 | Cannes Film Festival | Palme d'Or | My Brilliant Career | Nominated | |
| 1981 | Golden Globe Awards | Best Picture - Foreign Film | My Brilliant Career | Nominated | |
| 1979 | Australian Film Institute Awards | Best Director | My Brilliant Career | Won | |
| 1981 | London Critics Circle Film Awards | Special Achievement Award | My Brilliant Career | Won | |
| 1985 | Berlin Film Festival | Golden Bear | Mrs. Soffel | Nominated | |
| 1987 | Australian Film Institute Awards | Best Director | High Tide | Nominated | |
| 1992 | Australian Film Institute Awards | Best Director | The Last Days of Chez Nous | Nominated | |
| 1992 | Berlin Film Festival | Golden Bear | The Last Days of Chez Nous | Nominated | |
| 1995 | Brisbane International Film Festival | Chauvel Award | | Won | |
| 1995 | Women in Film Crystal Awards | Dorothy Arzner Directors Award | | Won | |
| 1996 | Australian Film Institute Awards | Best Documentary | Not Fourteen Again | Won | |
| 2006 | Australian Film Institute Awards | Best Direction in a Documentary | Unfolding Florence: The Many Lives of Florence Broadhurst | Nominated | |
| 2006 | Sundance Film Festival | Grand Jury Prize | Unfolding Florence: The Many Lives of Florence Broadhurst | Nominated | |
| 2007 | Australian Directors Guild Awards | Outstanding Achievement | Unfolding Florence: The Many Lives of Florence Broadhurst | Won | |
| 2010 | Australian Directors Guild Awards | Outstanding Achievement | Love, Lust & Lies | Won | |
| 2015 | Australian Academy of Cinema and Television Arts | Best Feature Length Documentary | Women He's Undressed | Nominated | |

== Filmography ==
Short film

| Year | Title | Director | Writer | Producer |
|---|---|---|---|---|
| 1970 | Old Man and Dog | Yes | No | No |
| 1971 | Roof Needs Mowing | Yes | No | No |
| 1973 | Satdee Night | Yes | Yes | No |
| 1973 | One Hundred a Day | Yes | Yes | No |
| 1973 | Gretel | Yes | Yes | No |
| 1975 | The Singer and the Dancer | Yes | Yes | Yes |

Documentary film

| Year | Title | Notes |
|---|---|---|
| 1976 | Smokes and Lollies | |
| 1980 | Touch Wood | |
| 1980 | Fourteen's Good, Eighteen's Better | Also producer |
| 1983 | Having a Go | |
| 1986 | Hard to Handle | Concert video of Bob Dylan's 1986 True Confessions tour with Tom Petty and the Heartbreakers. Screened as an HBO special. Released only on VHS. |
| 1988 | Bingo, Bridesmaids & Braces | |
| 1996 | Not Fourteen Again | |
| 2006 | Unfolding Florence: The Many Lives of Florence Broadhurst | |
| 2009 | Love, Lust & Lies | |
| 2015 | Women He's Undressed | |

Feature film

- My Brilliant Career (1979)
- Starstruck (1982)
- Mrs. Soffel (1984)
- High Tide (1987)
- Fires Within (1991)
- The Last Days of Chez Nous (1992)
- Little Women (1994)
- Oscar and Lucinda (1997)
- Charlotte Gray (2001)
- Death Defying Acts (2007)

Ref.:
