= Robert Langford =

British-Australian entrepreneur and politician

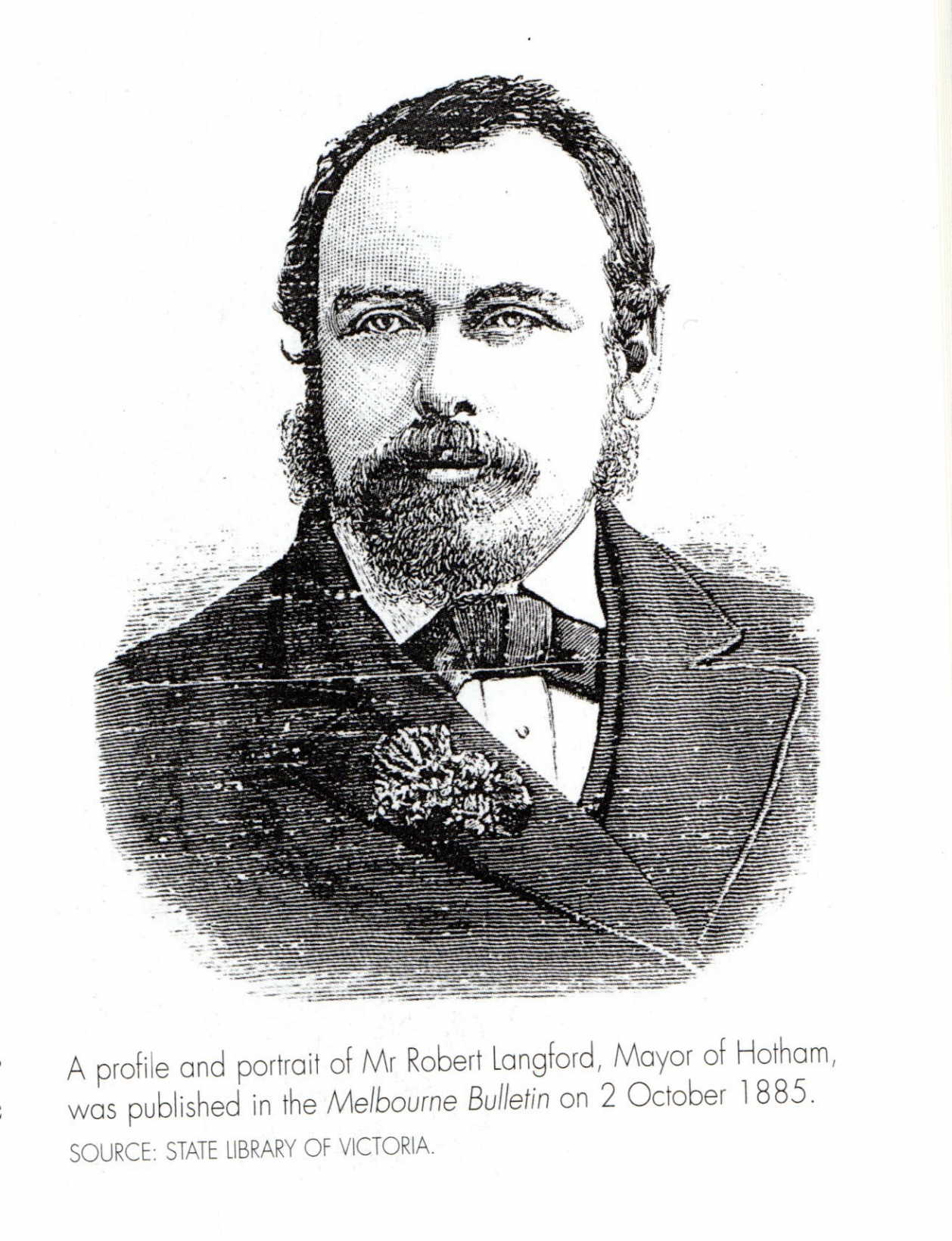
Robert Langford

Robert Langford (9 May 1849 – 18 October 1915) was an entrepreneur and politician. He was a Mayor of the Town of Hotham from 1884 to 1885. He also served two 3-year terms as councillor.

== Early life ==
Langford was born on 9 May 1849 in Gravesend, Kent, England. He arrived in Melbourne in 1856, where his father John found work as a fruiter agent for producers at the Eastern Markets. In 1866, at the age of 17, Robert started in the business of fish mongering at the markets in Flinders Street near Princes Bridge adjacent to the Yarra River. This proved to be a very lucrative business which financed the building of Milton Hall in 1884.

== Politics ==
Langford served at least two 3-year terms as a councillor for the Town of Hotham during a period of rapid development. He had a most illustrious year as Mayor in 1884-85

He was member of the Borough of Flemington and Kensington council, and occupied that position up to the time that municipality, together with North Melbourne, was added to the City of Melbourne.

Among his patronage of many community and charitable organisations such as the Art Union, the Thespian Amateur Dramatic Club, the Hotham Board of Advice for the administration of schools, Langford chaired a meeting to form a local volunteer defence corps and served on the bench of the Magistrate's Court as a Justice of the Peace. His leadership extended to presiding over a meeting of 500 supporters of the Hotham Football Club which became the North Melbourne Football Club.

== Family ==
Langford married Mary Elizabeth (Lizzie) Miller 5 August 1872.

Langford died on 18 October 1915 in Port Melbourne, Victoria.
