= List of town halls in Melbourne =

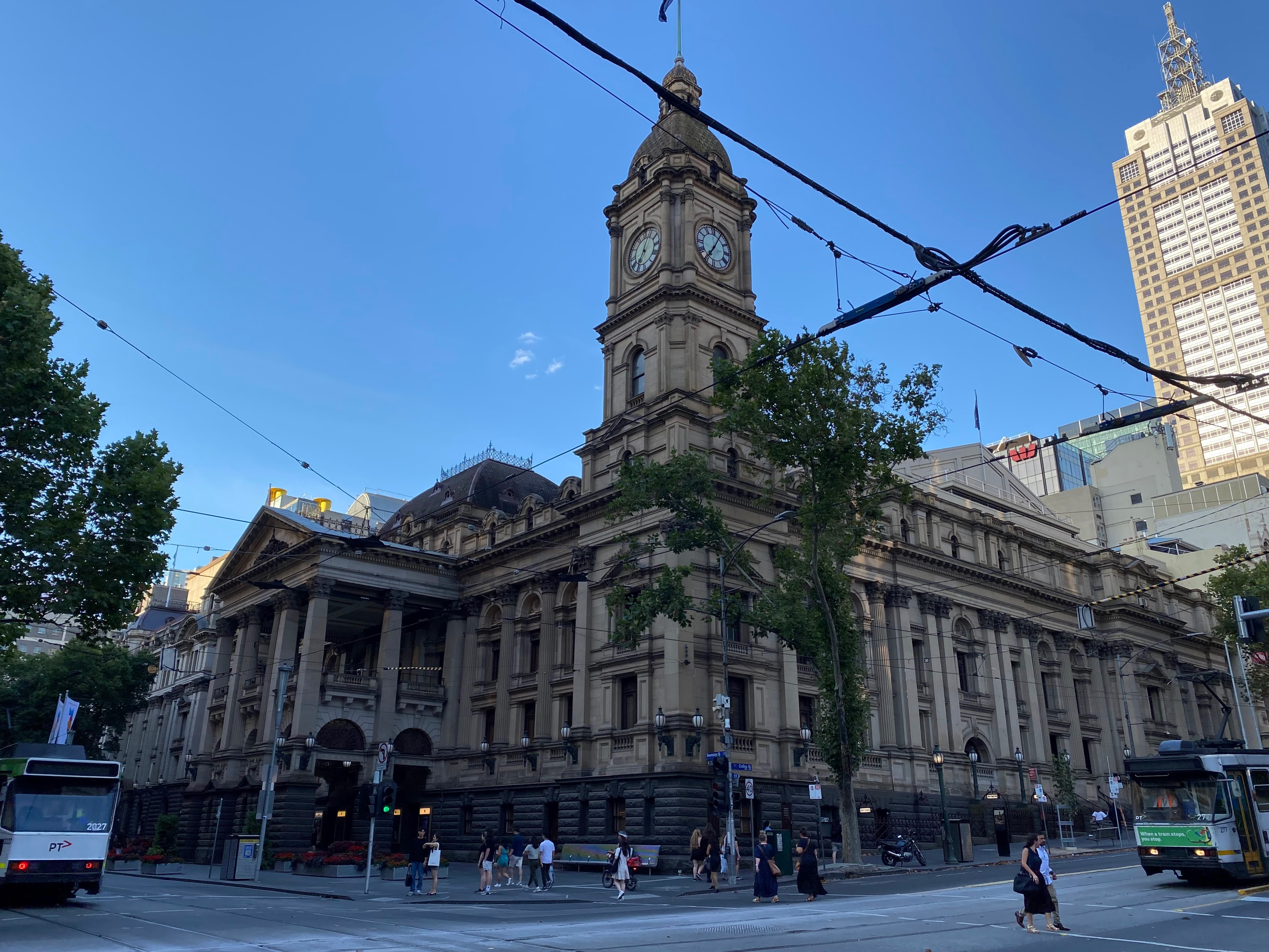
Melbourne Town Hall

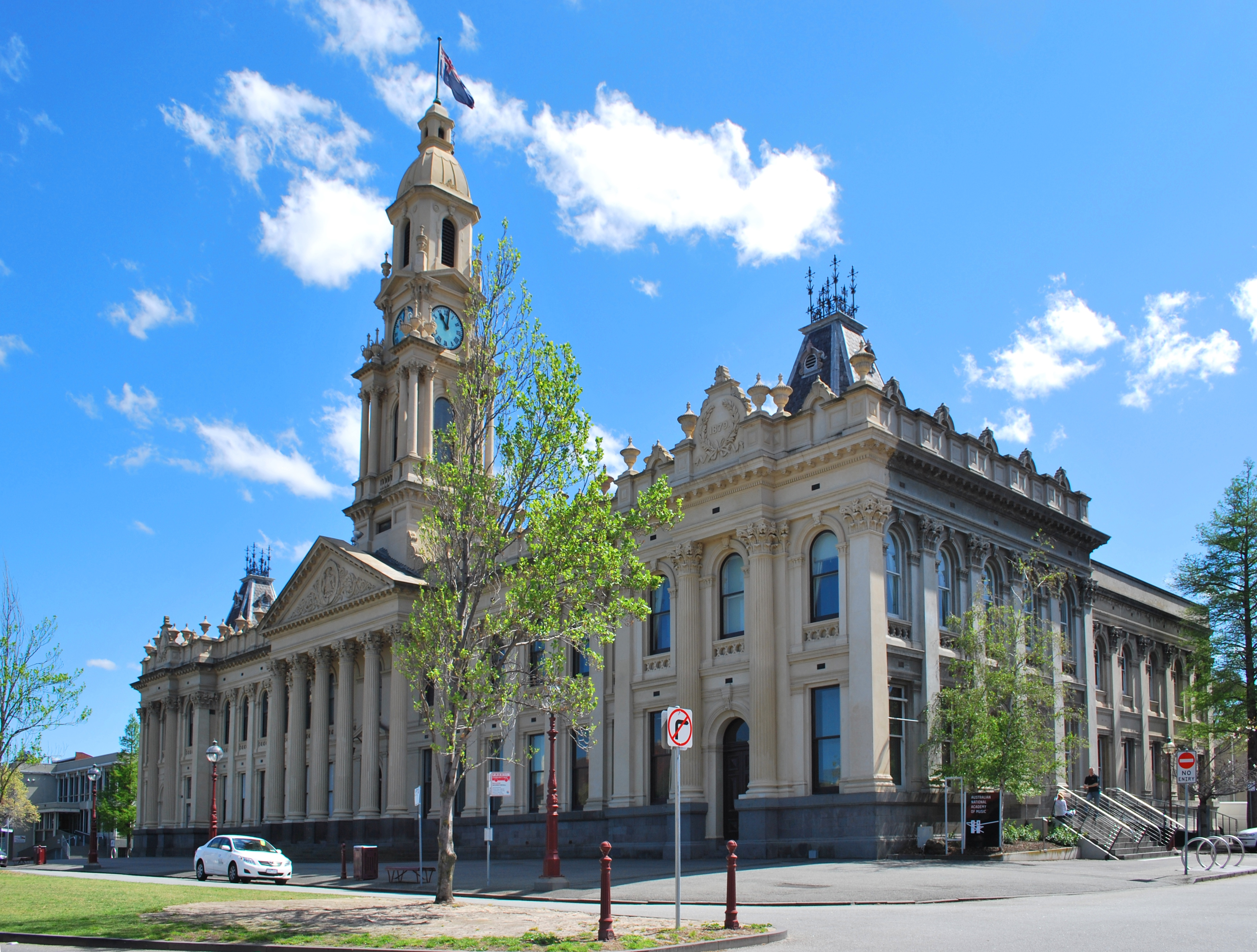
South Melbourne Town Hall

This is a list of town halls in Melbourne, Australia, with the local government area listed after them.

- Box Hill Town Hall – City of Whitehorse
- Brighton Town Hall, Melbourne – City of Bayside
- Broadmeadows Town Hall – City of Hume
- Brunswick Town Hall – City of Merri-bek
- Camberwell Town Hall – City of Boroondara
- Clocktower Centre (formerly Essendon Town Hall) – City of Moonee Valley
- Coburg City Hall – City of Merri-bek
- Collingwood Town Hall – City of Yarra
- Dandenong Town Hall – City of Greater Dandenong
- Fitzroy Town Hall – City of Yarra
- Footscray Town Hall –City of Maribyrnong
- Glen Eira Town Hall (formerly Caulfield City Hall) – City of Glen Eira
- Hawthorn Town Hall – City of Boroondara
- Heidelberg Town Hall – City of Banyule
- Kensington Town Hall – City of Melbourne
- Malvern Town Hall – City of Stonnington
- Melbourne Town Hall – City of Melbourne
- Moorabbin Town Hall – City of Kingston
- Northcote Town Hall – City of Darebin
- North Melbourne Town Hall (formerly Hotham Town Hall) – City of Melbourne
- Oakleigh Town Hall - City of Monash
- Port Melbourne Town Hall – City of Port Phillip
- Prahran Town Hall – City of Stonnington
- Preston Town Hall – City of Darebin
- Richmond Town Hall – City of Yarra
- South Melbourne Town Hall (formerly Emerald Hill Town Hall) – City of Port Phillip
- St Kilda Town Hall – City of Port Phillip
- Williamstown Town Hall – City of Hobsons Bay

== See also ==
- List of Melbourne suburbs
- Local government areas of Victoria
