= Club Wild =

Australian disability-friendly cabaret club

- Founded: 1998
- Type: Disability access
- Location: Melbourne
- Region served: Melbourne, Country Victoria, Sydney
- Product: dance parties, workshops
- Key people: Phil Heuzenroeder
- Website: http://www.clubwild.net/

Club Wild began in 1998 in Melbourne, Victoria, as Australia's first disability-friendly cabaret club. The director of the club is Melbourne musician Phil Heuzenroeder. Club Wild is now managed by Wild At Heart Community Arts, based at the Meat Market in North Melbourne, Australia. www.wildatheart.org.au

The club is run by and for the disabled and institutionalised. Club Wild stages dance parties and music concerts in Melbourne and in country Victorian towns such as Colac, Bendigo, Bairnsdale, and Wodonga. It was started in 1998 by a joint venture of the Big Bag Band, Arts Access, and Community Music Victoria under the auspices of Geelong's St. Laurence Community Services.

Club Wild is based at North Melbourne Town Hall and runs regular workshops for people of all ages with all kinds of disabilities, including those who live in institutions because of disabilities to participate in all aspects of running and performing in the dance parties, all of which show them how much they care.

The Club has also produced dance party events for International Day of People With A Disability at the Sydney Opera House in 2004 and 2005.

== Awards ==
Club Wild was awarded a Celebrating Melbourne Award in 2004 by the City of Melbourne for its achievements in making life in the City more accessible.
