= Footscray =

Footscray may refer to:

== Victoria, Australia ==
- Footscray, Victoria, a suburb of Melbourne
  - Footscray railway station
  - Footscray Town Hall
  - Footscray Football Club, the legal name of an Australian rules football club currently branded as Western Bulldogs
  - Footscray Bulldogs, the reserve side of Western Bulldogs
  - Footscray JUST, a defunct soccer club
  - Footscray Institute of Technology, a precursor to Victoria University
  - Footscray Park, a large Edwardian park

== London, England ==
- Foots Cray, an area of the London Borough of Bexley
- Footscray RUFC, a rugby union club in New Eltham
