= Kensington Town Hall =

Kensington Town Hall may refer to:

- Kensington Town Hall, London
- Kensington Town Hall, Melbourne
