= Craig D'Alton =

Australian Anglican priest

Craig D'Alton has been Archdeacon of Melbourne since 2016: he was previously the vicar of St Mary, North Melbourne.
