= North Melbourne =

- Suburb
- Aerial view of North Melbourne

- Interactive map of North Melbourne
- Coordinates: 37°47′57″S 144°56′48″E
- Country: Australia
- State: Victoria
- City: Melbourne
- LGA: City of Melbourne
- Location: 3 km (1.9 mi) from Melbourne
- Established: 1850s

Government
  - State electorate: Melbourne
  - Federal division: Melbourne

Area
  - Total: 2.4 km^{2} (0.93 sq mi)
- Elevation: 13 m (43 ft)

Population
  - Total: 14,953 (2021 census)
  - Density: 6,230/km^{2} (16,100/sq mi)
- Postcode: 3051
Suburbs around North Melbourne
Flemington	Travancore	Parkville
Kensington	North Melbourne	Carlton
West Melbourne	West Melbourne	Melbourne

North Melbourne is an inner-city suburb in Melbourne, Victoria, Australia, 3 km (1.9 mi) north-west of Melbourne's Central Business District, located within the local government area of City of Melbourne. North Melbourne recorded a population of 14,953 at the 2021 census.

North Melbourne is bounded by the CityLink freeway to the west, Victoria Street to the south, O'Connell and Peel Streets to the east and Flemington Road to the north. Since July 2008 its local government area has been the City of Melbourne, when it took over the administration of parts of Kensington and North Melbourne that were previously under the City of Moonee Valley, resulting in an increase of approximately 4760 residents and almost 3000 workers (2006 Census).

Formerly known as Hotham, it was essentially a working class area, with some middle class pockets, and was one of the first towns in Victoria to be granted Municipal status.

Today it is noted for its Victorian architecture, cosmopolitan demographic, commercial and older industrial areas.

== History ==
North Melbourne's first institutions were built in the 1840s, beginning with a cattle yard. At this time the area was not well defined and included Parkville and Royal Park, as well as a part of West Melbourne.

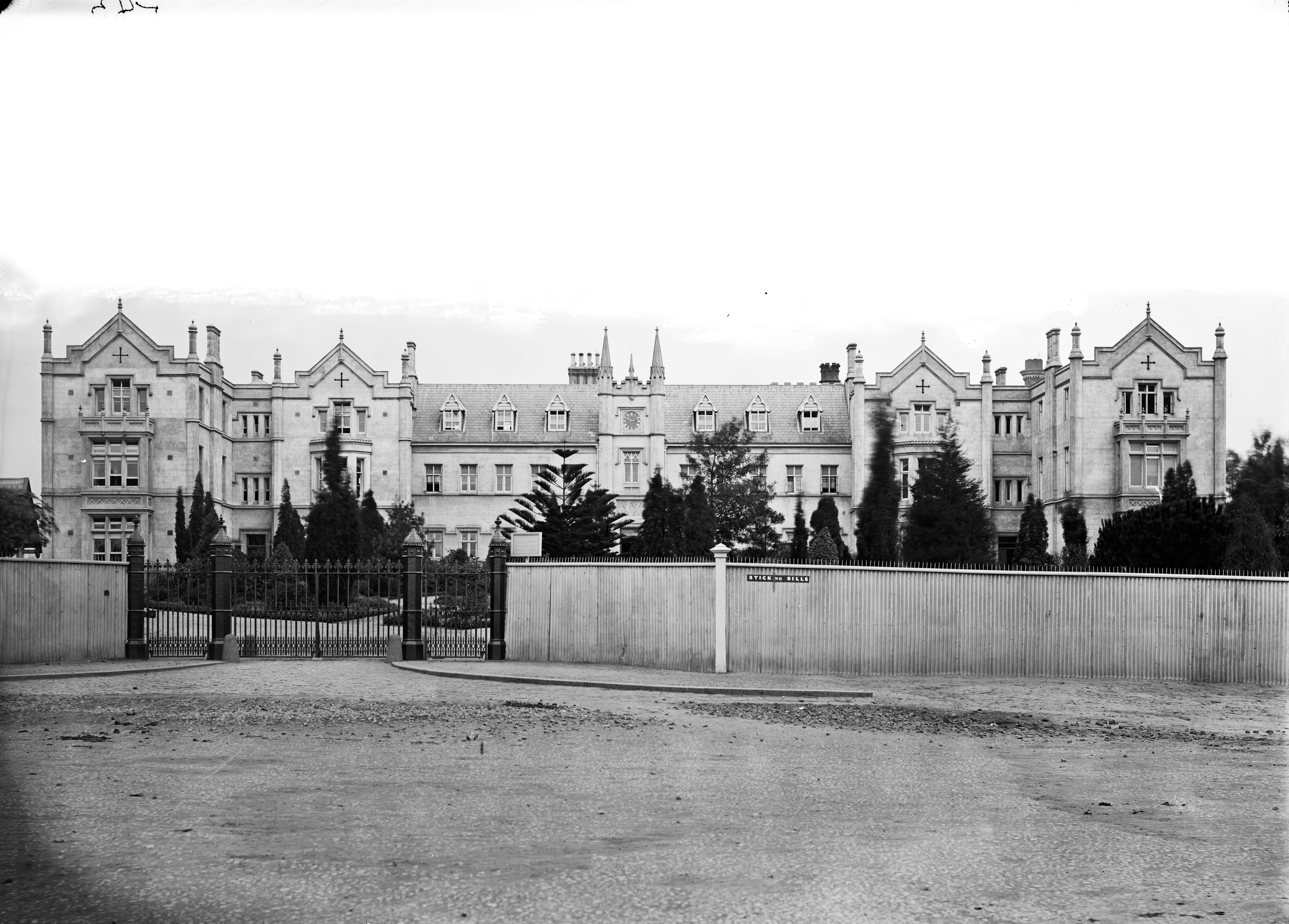
Benevolent Asylum, Hotham, Melbourne, 1870-1875

In the 1850s a Benevolent Asylum was built between Abbotsford and Curzon Streets, coinciding with the desire to find space to accommodate the growing population from the gold rush. (The Asylum remained a feature of the area until its move to Cheltenham in 1911.) In 1859 the area separated from the City of Melbourne and proclaimed as the municipal Borough of Hotham, after the Governor of Victoria Charles Hotham. Hotham Post Office opened on 20 March 1860.

By 1861, Hotham had a population of over 7,000.

In 1869, some of these decided to form the Hotham Football Club that later became a foundation member of the VFA (Australian rules football), today known as the North Melbourne Kangaroos. On 26 August 1887, the Borough was renamed North Melbourne. By this time it included an imposing North Melbourne Town Hall and the Metropolitan Meat Market, both designed by the architect George Raymond Johnson.

Although there were pockets of middle class housing in the wider tree-lined streets such as Dryburgh, Chapman and Brougham, by the 1880s the suburb had become a predominantly working class area with most of the male population employed in local industry.

In the 1890s tram routes had entered the area as far as Abbotsford Street, walking distance from the Arden Street Oval.

In 1905 North Melbourne was absorbed once again into the City of Melbourne.

In the 1930s many areas of North Melbourne, in particular the laneways, became overcrowded and defined as slums. As such, large government housing development projects were proposed, which were eventually completed in the 1960s.

The North Melbourne Court of Petty Sessions closed on 1 January 1968 and the former courthouse was sold to a private buyer in 1981.

North Melbourne was ranked 24th coolest suburb in the world by Time Out magazine.

== Commercial centre ==
The main shopping strip of Errol Street is located largely between North Melbourne Town Hall and Victoria Street, with some further shops to the east, west and north of the intersection of Errol and Queensberry.

== Demographics ==
Historical population
Year	Pop.	±%
2001	9,181	—
2006	9,962	+8.5%
2011	11,755	+18.0%
2016	14,940	+27.1%

North Melbourne's real estate is above the Melbourne median and the suburb remains an overwhelmingly middle-class community. However, the median weekly household income was $1,236 at the 2016 census, which was lower than the national median of $1,438.

The presence of recent migrants is evident, including many refugees from countries such as Somalia and Eritrea who often live around the government-owned housing estates near the Melrose Street area, on the suburb's fringe. At the 2016 census, 41.7% of residents reported being born in Australia, compared to the national average of 66.7%; the next most common countries of birth were China 13.5%, Malaysia 2.9%, Vietnam 2.4%, England 2.3% and New Zealand 2.2%.

Residents of North Melbourne are significantly younger than most other areas of Australia; their median age was 28 years, whereas the national median age is 38. Children aged under 15 years made up 10.5% of the population and people aged 65 years and over made up just 7.1% of the population.

=== Religion ===
The most common religious affiliation in North Melbourne was "no religion" and accounted for 46.6% of responses at the 2016 census. Notable churches in North Melbourne include the Curzon Street Church (now known as St Mark the Evangelist), St Mary's Anglican Church and the ornate Ukrainian Catholic Cathedral, built in 1963, on the high section of Dryburgh Street. The Catholic Church and Parish Primary School of St Michaels are also located in North Melbourne.

=== Housing ===
Historically, the predominant housing types were old Victorian-style terrace houses, warehouses, and some low-rise apartments. By the time of the 2011 census, this had changed and 65.5% of private dwellings were flats, units or apartments. 27% were semi-detached (row or terrace houses, townhouses etc.), 6.2% were separate houses, and 0.4% were classified as "other dwellings".

North Melbourne was slower to gentrify than other inner suburbs, due to established families resisting the sale of their homes for decades. A younger generation finally began to move in the 1980s, capitalising on the proximity to the Melbourne City Centre. Many of the old factories and warehouses were converted into fashionable loft-style apartments in the 1990s. Since 2000, there has been a large increase in new medium density apartment complexes being built and house prices now exceed Melbourne's median.

As of February 2016, the median house price was $882,500 at an annual growth of 7.25%. The median price of units was $487,500, having grown at 5.72%.

In the 12-month period to January 2020 North Melbourne reported a median house price of A$1.38 million for a three bedroom house.

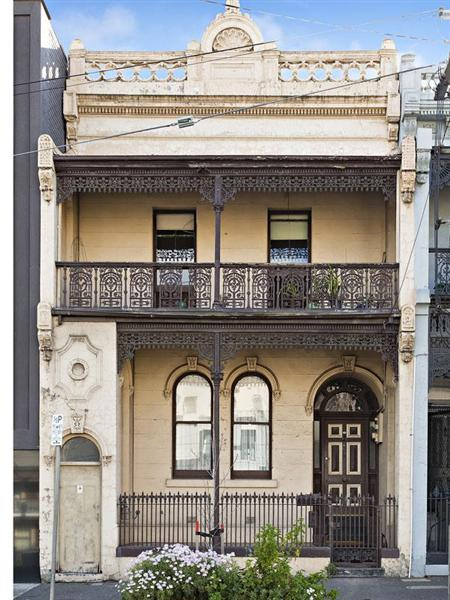
Known as "Boom Style" Victorian architecture, due to the extravagant detail and finishes used during the Gold Rush era. Terrace "Auburn" built 1879 (Peel Street North Melbourne) is an excellent example of this style of intact architecture.

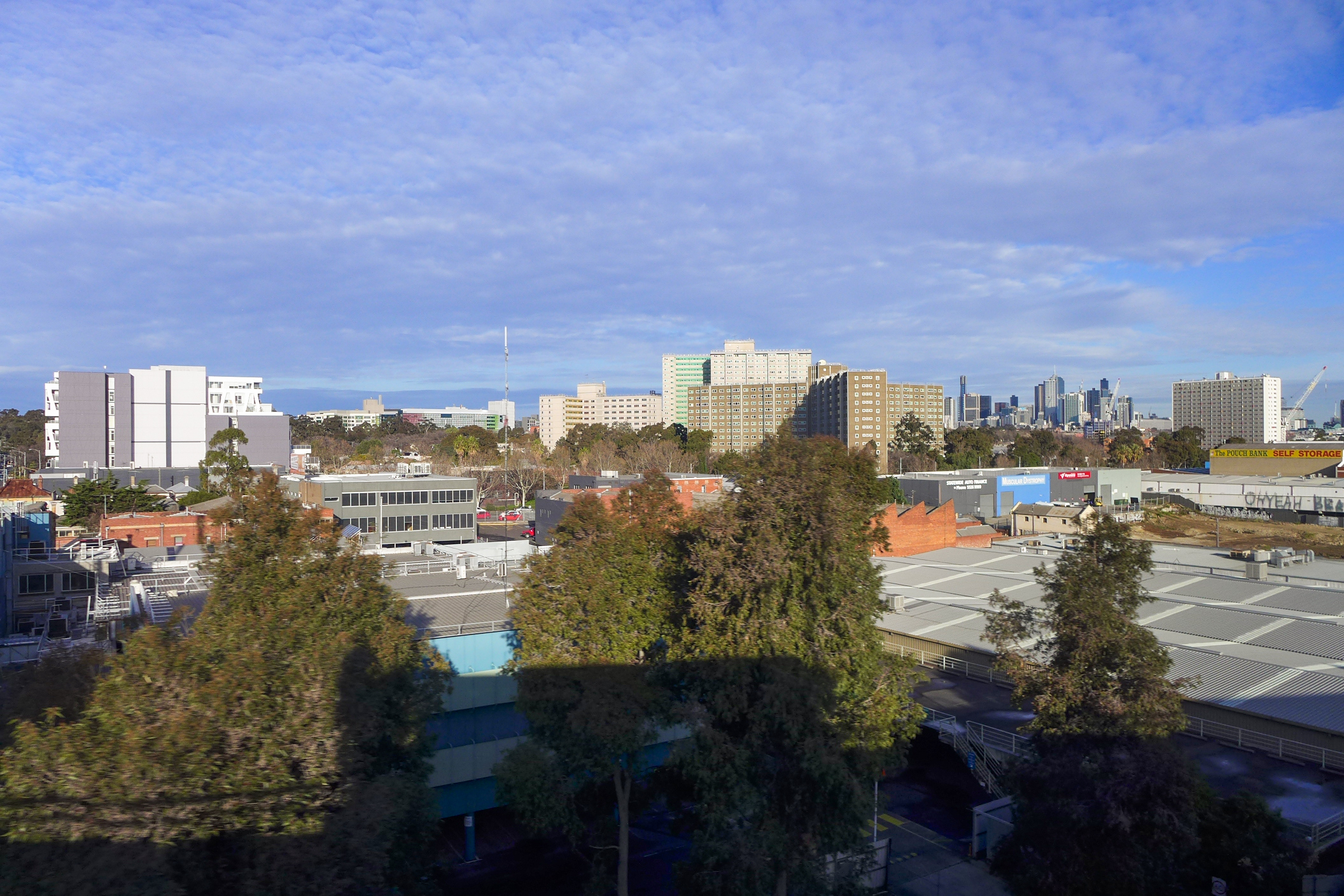
Housing in North Melbourne

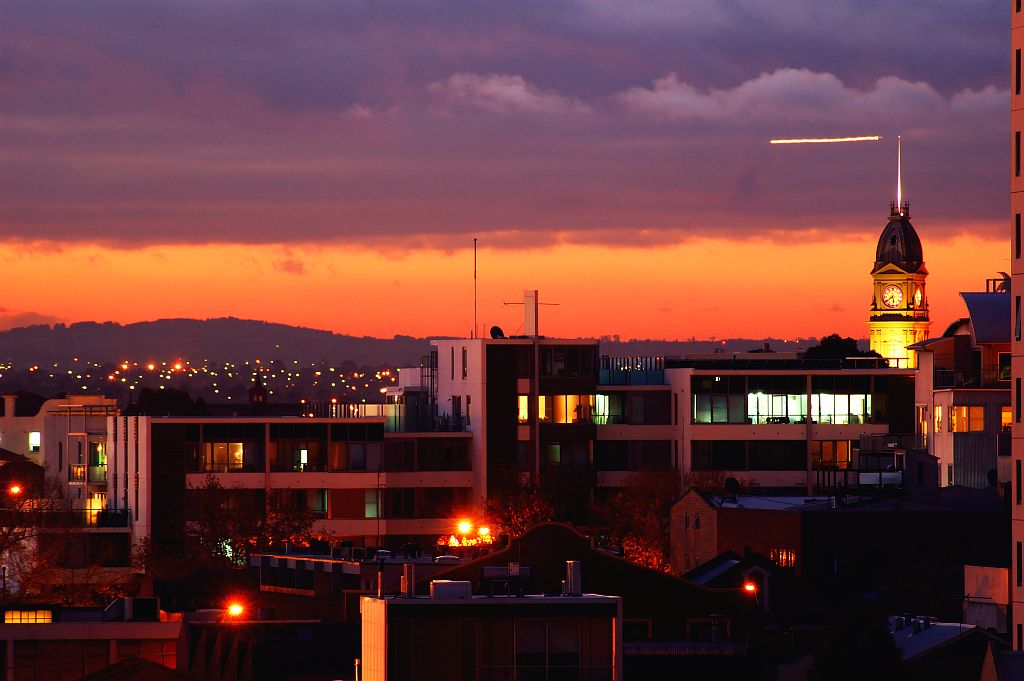
Apartments in North Melbourne. The clock tower of the North Melbourne Town Hall is on the far right.

== Culture ==
"Spring Fling" is an annual festival for North and West Melbourne.

The heritage listed town hall and former Meat Market are both theatre and arts spaces.

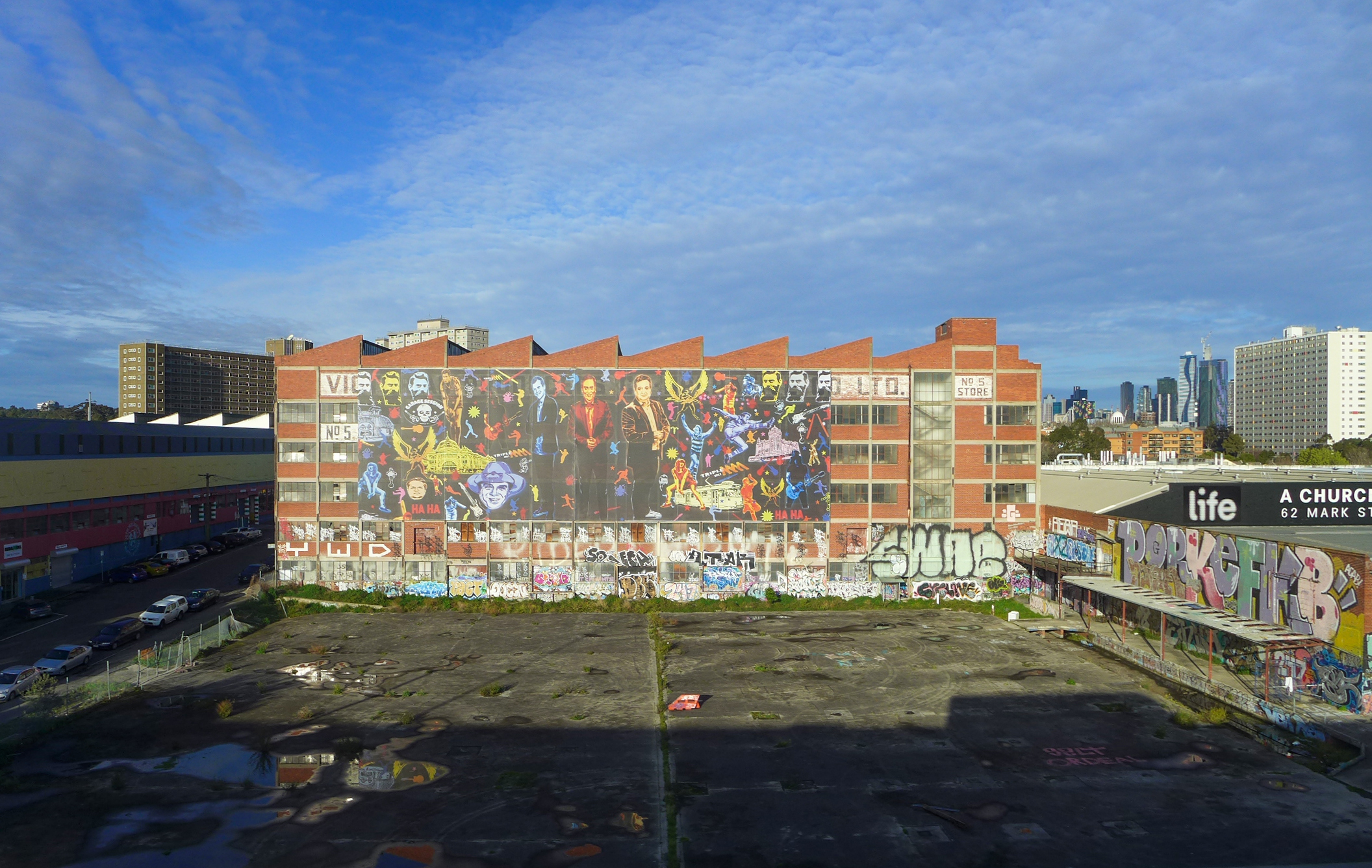
Artwall in North Melbourne Abandoned wool store

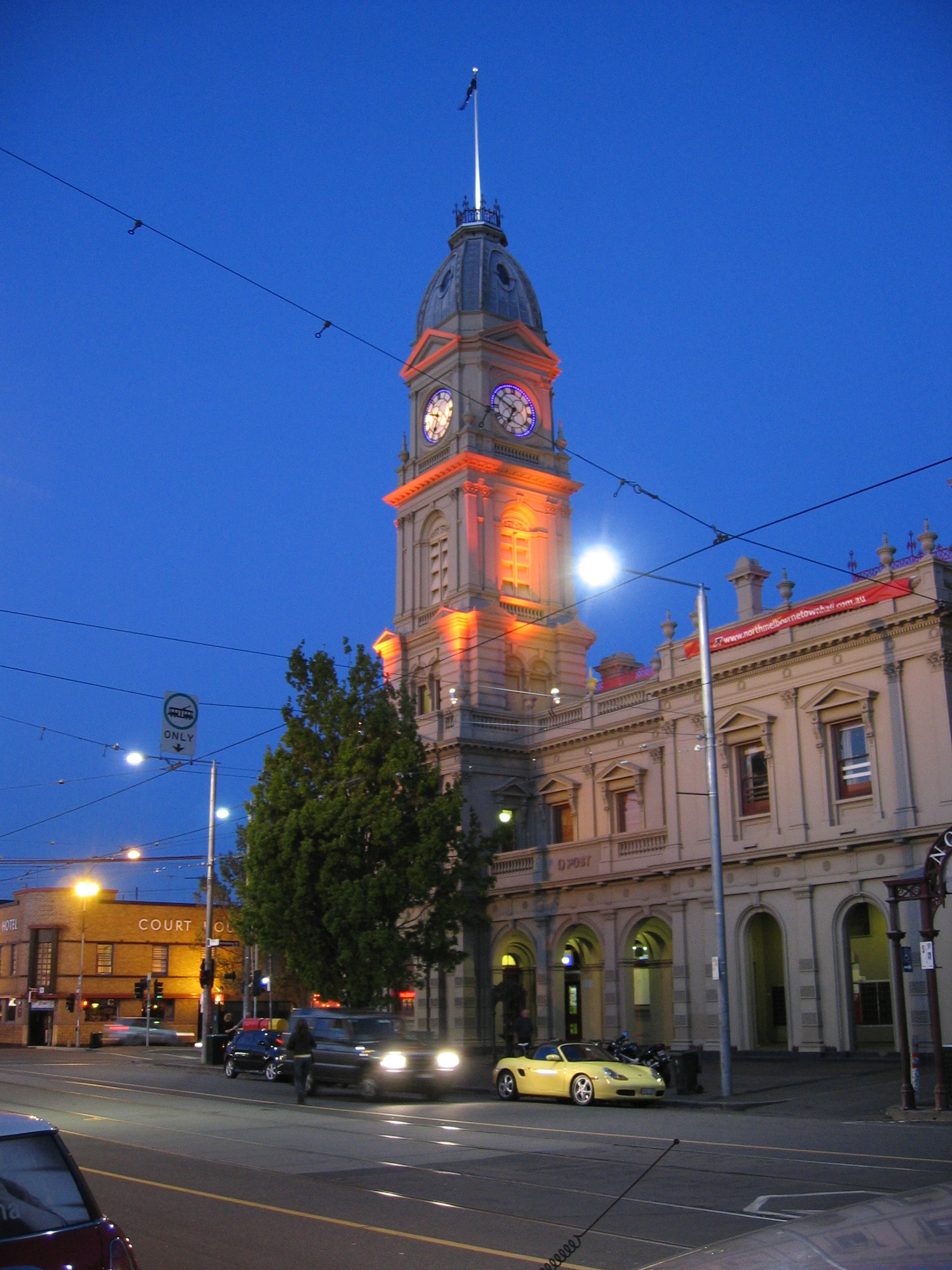
Former Hotham (North Melbourne) Town Hall and Errol Street

=== Sport ===
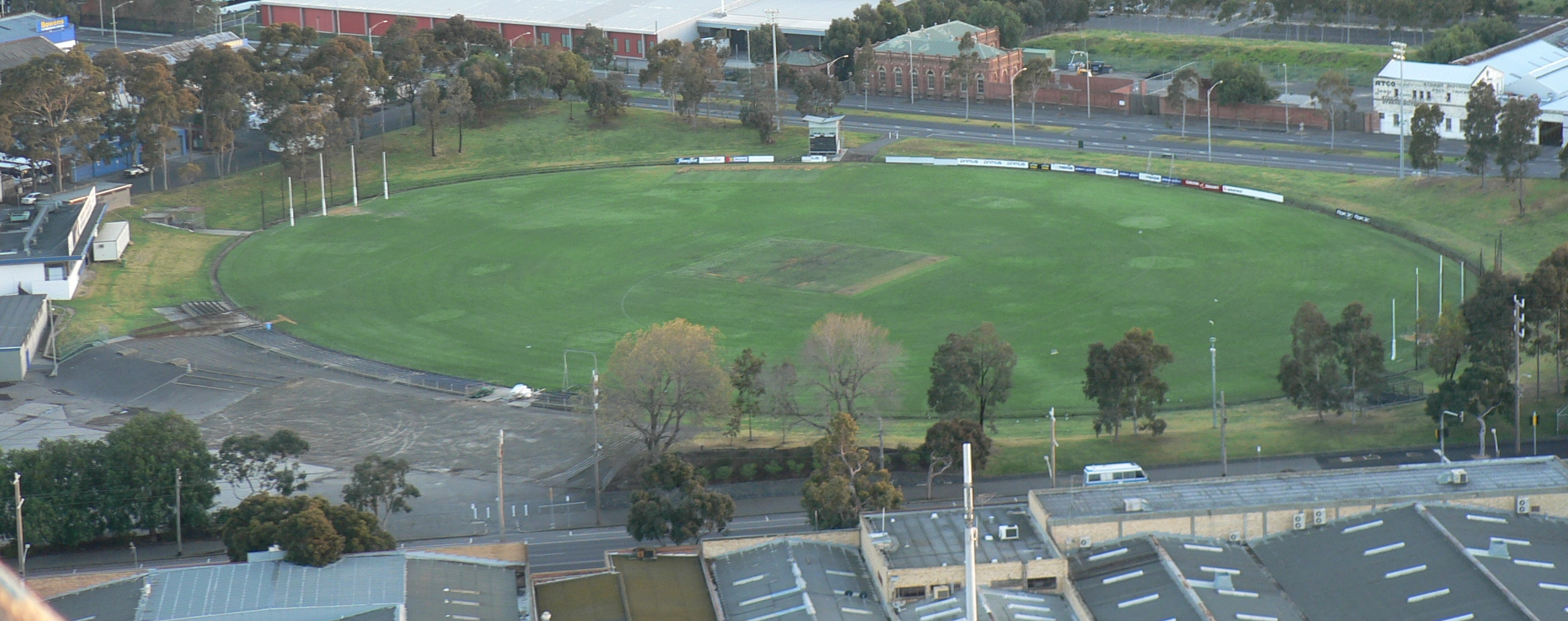
Arden Street Oval, home to the North Melbourne Football Club

The North Melbourne Football Club is still active and plays in the national Australian football competition, the Australian Football League. The club's football department and training sessions are based at its traditional home ground at North Melbourne Cricket Ground, which has recently been redeveloped. Since 2019 both AFLW and VFL teams once again play there, bringing football back after a 34-year absence

== Transport ==
Major roads include Flemington Road, Elizabeth Street and Victoria Street.

The suburb is served by two railway stations, Flemington Bridge and Macaulay, both on the Upfield line. Despite the naming, the North Melbourne railway station is actually in the adjacent suburb of West Melbourne, while the Flemington Bridge railway station is within North Melbourne boundaries and not in Flemington. Arden railway station is planned to be built on Arden Street within North Melbourne's industrial area, as part of the Melbourne Metro Rail Project.

North Melbourne is serviced by three tram routes:

- 57 – West Maribyrnong to Flinders Street station; travels down Flemington Road, and then Abbotsford, Queensberry, Errol, and Victoria Streets.
- 58 – West Coburg to Toorak; travels through Royal Park, and then down Flemington Road.
- 59 – Airport West to Flinders Street station; travels down Flemington Road.

It also has a number of bus routes.

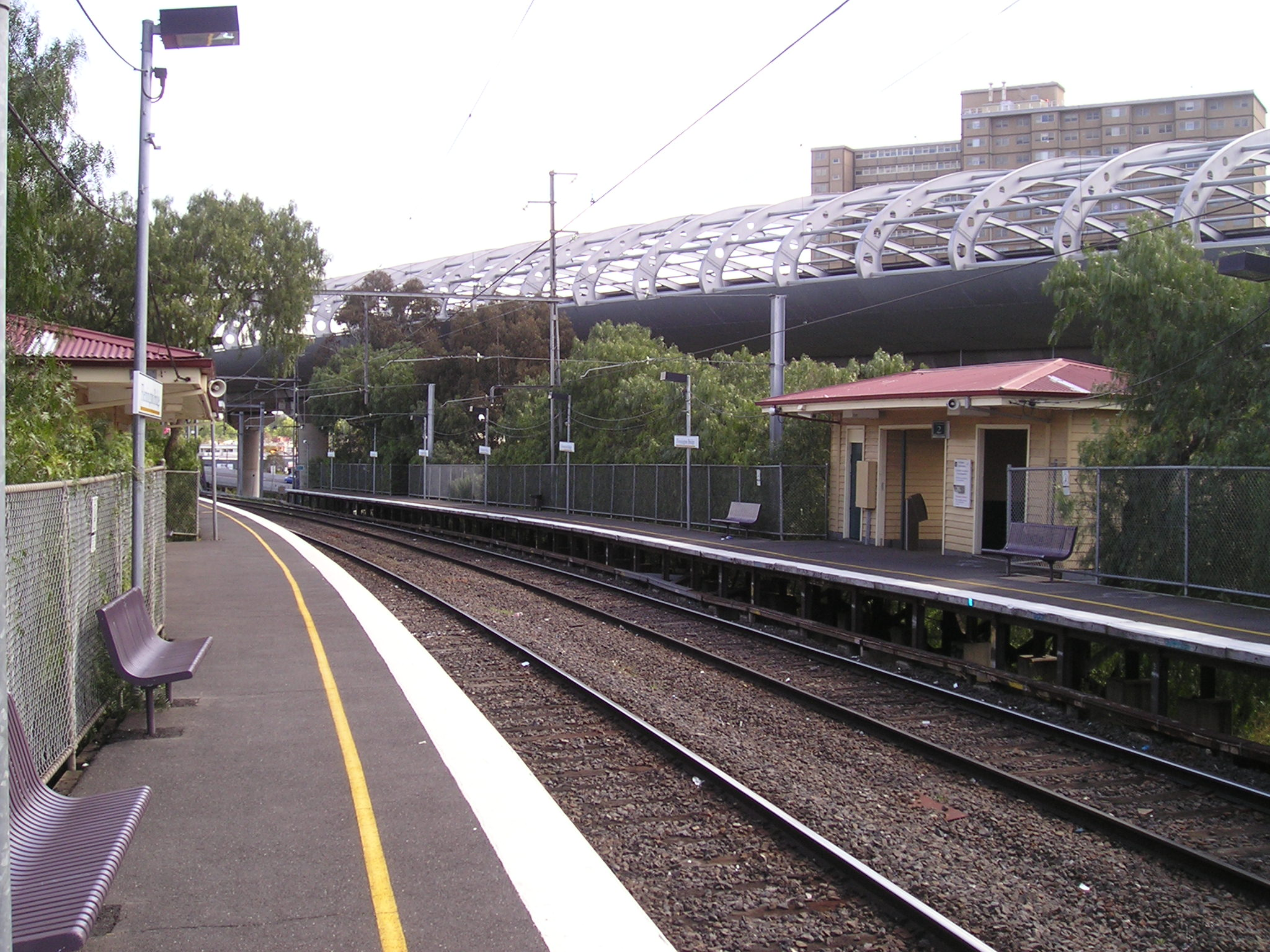
Flemington Bridge railway station

== See also ==
- City of Essendon – Parts of North Melbourne were previously within this former local government area.
- City of Moonee Valley – Parts of North Melbourne were previously within this local government area.
