= Camberwell Town Hall =

Former town hall in Melbourne, Victoria, Australia

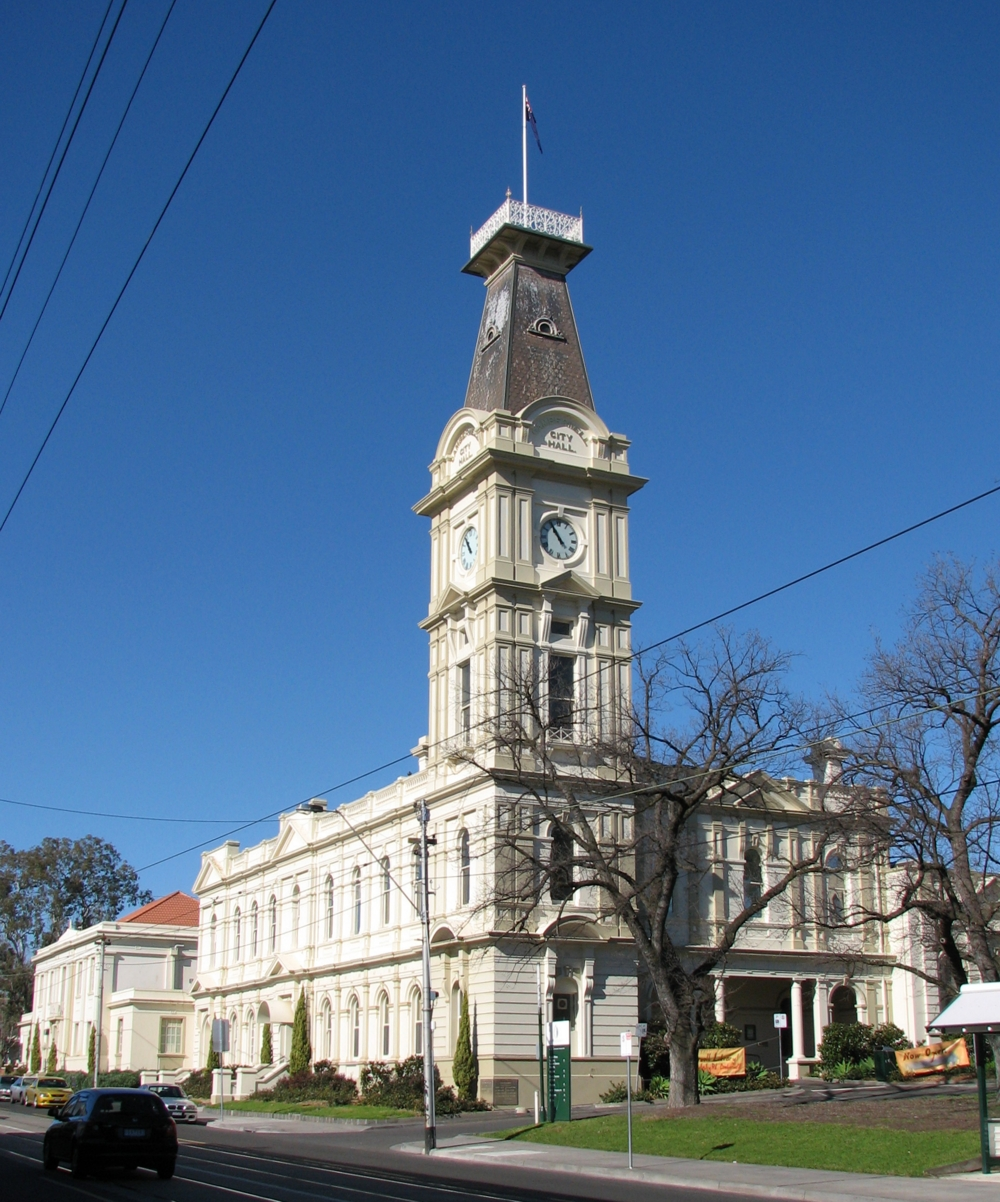
- The former town hall, viewed from Camberwell Road

- Location of the former town hall in Greater Metropolitan Melbourne

General information
- Status: Completed
- Type: Town hall (1891–1994)
- Architectural style: Victorian Free Classical; Second Empire
- Location: 8 Inglesby Road, Camberwell, City of Boroondara, Melbourne, Victoria, Australia
- Coordinates: 37°50′04″S 145°03′36″E
- Completed: 1891; 135 years ago
- Client: Boroondara Shire Council
- Owner: City of Boroondara

The Camberwell Town Hall is a former town hall, situated at 8 Inglesby Road, Camberwell, in the City of Boroondara, in the inner eastern suburbs of Melbourne, Victoria, Australia.

== Overview ==
The town hall was constructed for the Boroondara Shire Council in the late 1880s and completed in 1891, in the Victorian Free Classical style. The building also has a Second Empire influence, most notable in the clock tower that is capped with a truncated pyramid roof. The building is located within the City of Boroondara Civic and Community Precinct that includes other municipal, religious, and school buildings, public gardens, tennis courts, and a lawn bowling green, in a Victorian era setting.

The town hall became the Camberwell Town Hall when the town was proclaimed in 1906, which became the City of Camberwell in 1914. The building was extensively refurbished in the mid-1920s, and following the establishment of the City of Boroondara on 22 June 1994, new municipal offices were constructed alongside. The building was again refurbished in 2015 and housed the library for the City; subsequently relocated.

Up until 2022, the Camberwell Community Centre was located in the former town hall. It moved to a purpose-built facility at 33/35 Fairholm Grove, Camberwell where the Centre delivers courses that support and enhance connection through creativity, learning and wellbeing. Activities range from multi-cultural senior groups, social cards and games, and film and book clubs, as well as art, ceramics and languages. Room and hall hire is available.

== See also ==
- Architecture of Melbourne
- List of Town Halls in Melbourne
