= Criterion Theatre (Sydney) =

Theatre in Sydney, Australia (1886–1935)

Coordinates: 33°52′24″S 151°12′30″E

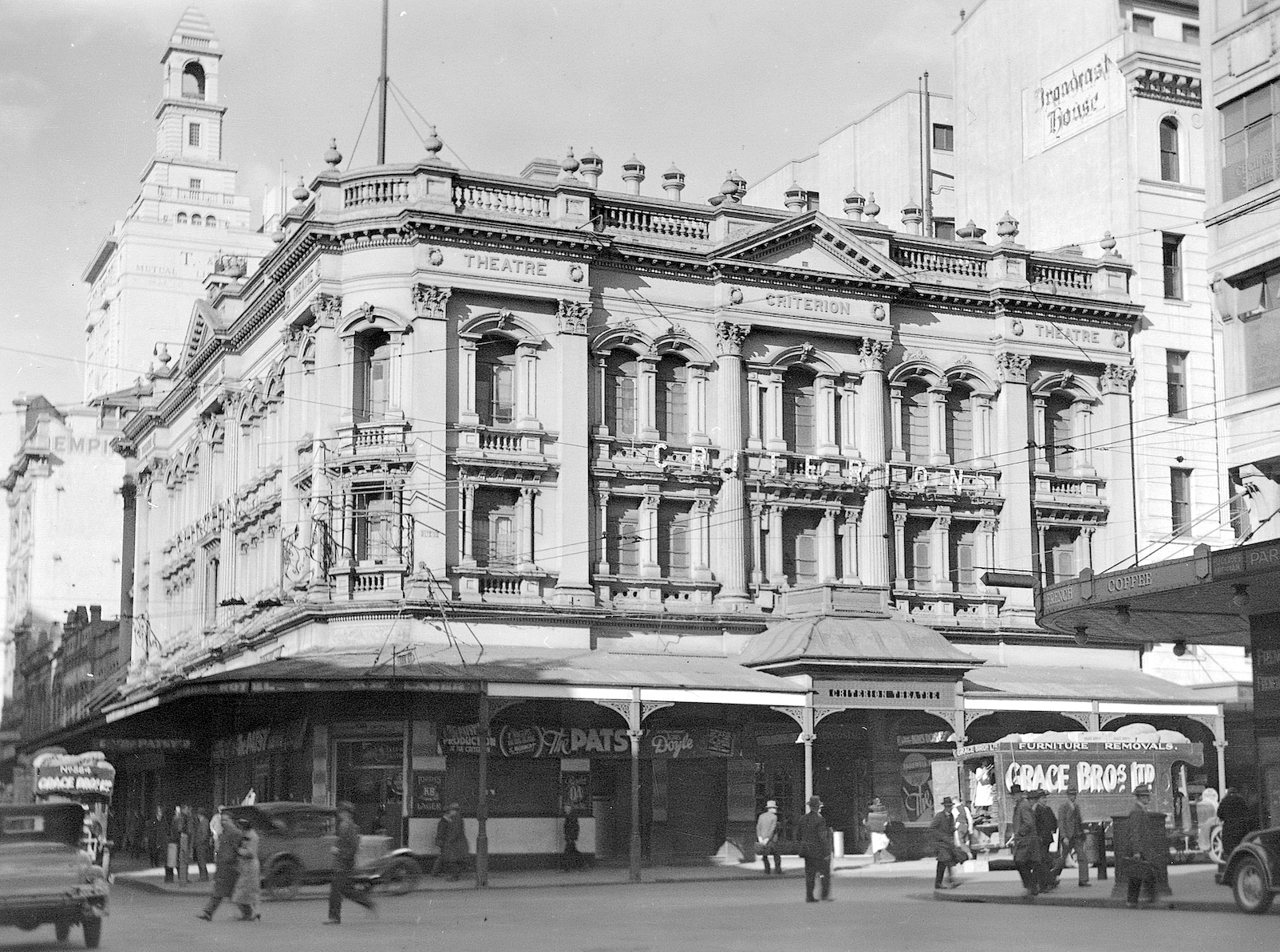
- Criterion Theatre, Sydney, from Park Street
- Interactive map of Criterion Theatre
- Address: Corner of Pitt and Park Street; Sydney; Australia
- Capacity: 991
- Type: Proscenium arch

Construction
- Opened: 27 December 1886
- Closed: 13 July 1935
- Demolished: 1935
- Architect: George R. Johnson

The Criterion Theatre was a theatre in Sydney, Australia, which was built in 1886 by architect George R. Johnson on the south east corner of Pitt and Park streets. It closed in 1935 and the building was demolished.

== History ==
The Criterion Theatre, often referred to as the 'Cri', opened on 27 December 1886. Situated on the south east corner of Pitt and Park streets, Sydney, it was funded by John Solomon (died 1902) and designed by architect George R. Johnson. The 'Cri' was Sydney's most famous intimate playhouse at the time, with a Neo-Renaissance exterior and a capacity of approximately 991 seats. The 'Cri' was used for drama and music performances for almost 50 years. It closed in 1935, partially as a result of the Depression and competition from cinemas, and was demolished in 1935, to facilitate the widening of Park Street. Prior to closure and demolition of the 'Cri', the north east corner of Pitt and Park streets was a popular meeting place for unemployed actors and was known as Poverty Point. The Criterion Family Hotel survived on the remaining narrow strip of land, and became a popular watering hole for actors engaged in radio plays at the nearby ABC studios.

== Design and construction ==
The Criterion Theatre was built in the baroque (Italianate) style or Neo-Renaissance style. It was conjoined with the Criterion Family Hotel. The internal design was Georgian colonial with a seating capacity of between 990 and 1000. The auditorium colour scheme was light blue and gold. Seats were covered in ruby plush velvet and balconies incorporated gilt and brocade. This was a distinct change from the conventions of theatre colour schemes at the time which tended to favour green baize. A portrait of James Cook proclaiming the east coast of Australia in the name of Britain descended between acts.

Although seen as an improvement on theatre design for Sydney, a report by the colonial architect was critical of inadequate and malodorous backstage facilities, in particular the orchestra pit and dressing rooms. This triggered a refurbishment in 1892. Interiors were remodelled along Moorish inspired colours of pale blue, fawn and gold. Cook's portrait was replaced by a Moorish Palace. A further refurbishment in 1905 addressed health and safety issues of backstage facilities as well as fireproofing, increased number of exits and additional seating capacity.

== Productions ==
The Criterion Theatre opened with the operetta Falka performed by the Rignold and Allison Opera Company. Other notable productions included The Sultan of Mocha (1890), The Kelly Gang (1898) and The Squatter's Daughter (1907). It hosted a number of production companies including Brough Bouicault Comedy Company (producing works by Pinero and Wilde), Henry Bracy's Comic Opera Company, Pollards Lilliputian Opera Company and the Curtis Minstrels. Expatriates Oscar Ashe and Lily Brayton also toured production at the 'Cri'. The final production at the 'Cri' was Barry Conners' The Patsy.

In 1915, J. C. Williamson's leased the 'Cri' from new owner Frank Musgrove. Williamson's imported London West End shows until the 'Cri' closed in 1935.
