= Yirramboi Festival =

Indigenous Australian cultural festival

The Yirramboi Festival, styled YIRRAMBOI, is a cultural festival celebrating the First Nations of Australia held biennially in the odd-numbered years in May in Melbourne, Australia. It is also subtitled or described as the Melbourne Indigenous Arts Festival and YIRRAMBOI: First Nations Arts Festival.

Yirramboi means "tomorrow" in the language of the Boon wurrung and Woi wurrung peoples of the Kulin nation. The first festival was held in the Metropolitan Meat Market in 2017.

It is hosted by the City of Melbourne, in partnership with First Nations People and Creative Victoria. The festival runs for 10 days, and attended and performed by First Peoples from across Victoria and the rest of the world.

In 2018, the festival collaborated with the Pulima Art Festival, an Indigenous arts festival in Taiwan, with a "Festival in Festival" program.

The most recent festivals were held from 6–16 May 2021, 4–14 May 2023 and 1–11 May 2025, with the next festival scheduled for May 2027.
