= Brunswick Town Hall =

Town hall in Victoria, Australia

Coordinates: 37.771732°S 144.960651°E

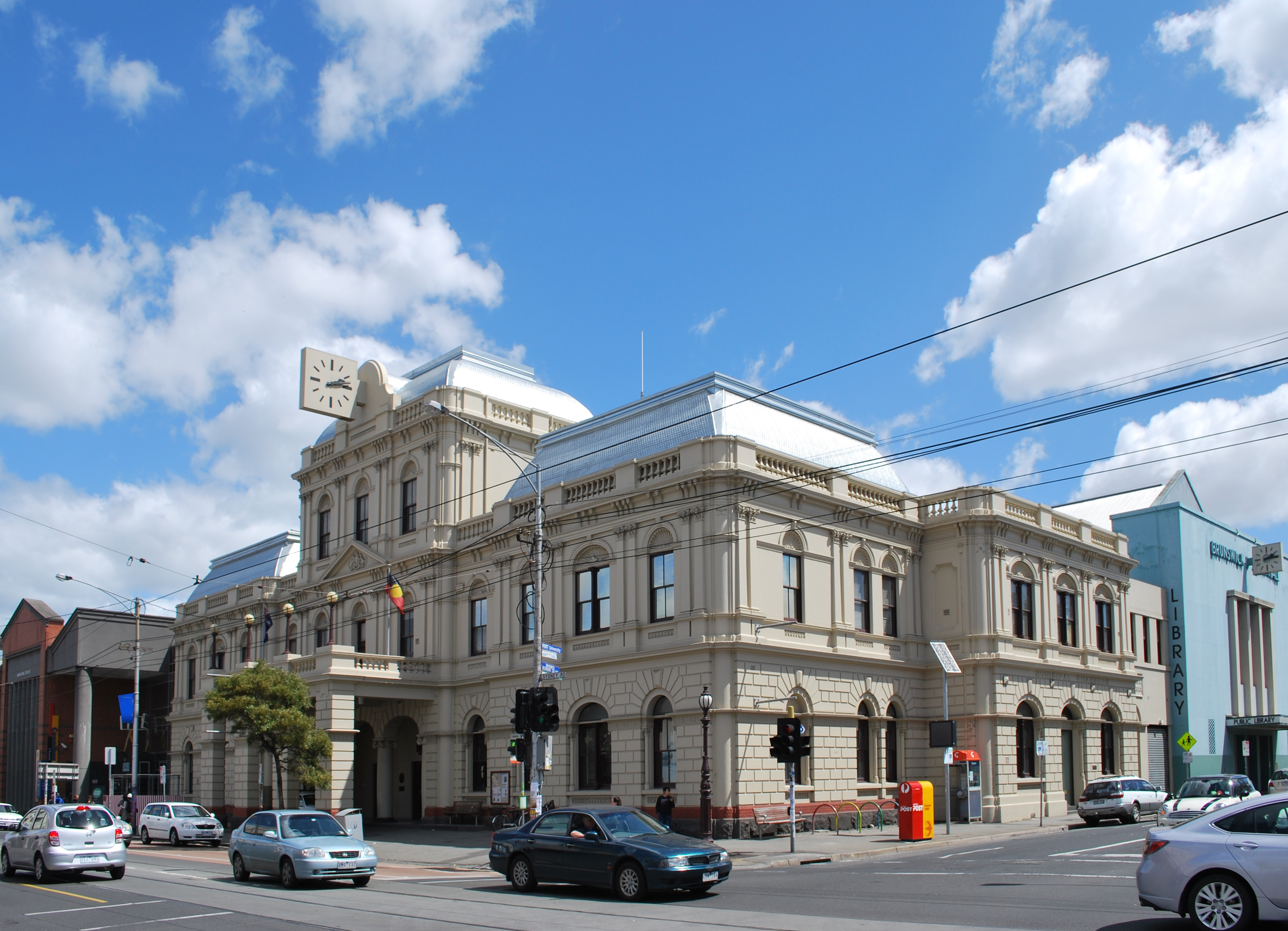
Brunswick Town Hall, main building along Sydney Road

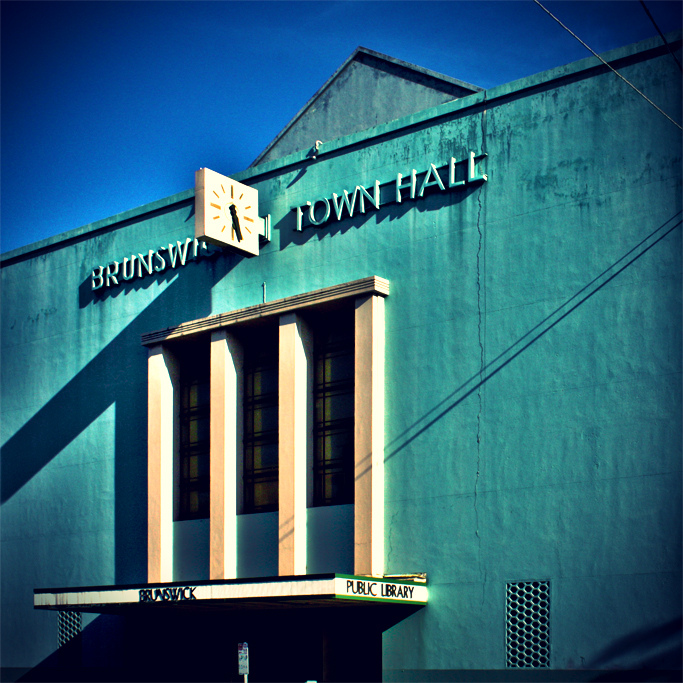
Brunswick Town Hall and library, Dawson Street façade

Brunswick Town Hall is located on the corner of Sydney Road and Dawson Street in the inner northern Melbourne suburb of Brunswick, Victoria, Australia.

== History ==
Brunswick was declared a municipality in 1857, after residents petitioned for municipal government. The first municipal chambers were erected in 1859 on Sydney Road at Lobb's Hill, between Stewart and Albion streets.

The present Town Hall began with the construction of what is now the central section in 1877, designed in Renaissance Revival style by Evander McIvor, consisting of three bays, with arched windows, rustication at the ground level, and paired pilasters above.

In 1888 a competition was held for a new structure, won by architect Sydney H Wilson, with a very grand scheme with a central clocktower, similar in style and elaboration to the just completed Collingwood Town Hall. The project however did not proceed, and instead an addition to the north in matching style was built in 1908, the same year Brunswick became a City.

In 1926 it was decided to finally complete the building, and include a smaller and larger hall, as well as offices for the Council. Sydney H Wilson was again the architect, along with Charles R Heath. The design incorporated the 1908 wing, with new sections to the south matching in detail, as part of an imposing building in Victorian Second Empire style, with a taller central section, mansard roofs, and a porte-cochere. The completed building, without the planned finials and cresting, opened in August 1927 with a 'brilliant spectacle'.

In 1938 some remodeling took place, with an internal refresh and a new facade to the larger hall facing Dawson Street in Moderne style.

During 1973 the Brunswick City Council embarked on a plan to demolish the Town Hall and build a modern five-story building to house all of council services. The Brunswick Progress Association led a successful public campaign in 1974 against council to stop the demolition of the town hall. In 1994 an addition was made to the south, in Postmodern style.

That same year saw the amalgamation of the City of Brunswick with the City of Coburg and the southern portion of the City of Broadmeadows to form the City of Moreland, with the main offices located at Coburg City Hall, relegating the Brunswick Town Hall to secondary offices and other public uses.

Since the 1990s, the town hall building contains the Counihan Gallery, and the Brunswick branch of the Merri-bek City Library in the former main hall. The smaller hall and the atrium are available for hire, and are a venue for the Brunswick Music Festival.

Diagonally opposite from the Town Hall is the Mechanics' Institute, built in 1868, and used for education and social activities. A monument to the Free Speech fights of the 1930s stands near the corner. The building was acquired by the Brunswick City Council in 1927 and for many years served as the Brunswick Municipal Library.
