= Joseph Plottel =

British born Australian architect (1883–1977)

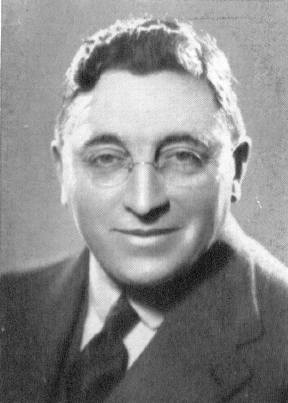
- Plottel in 1936
- Born: 1 January 1883; Yorkshire, Great Britain
- Died: 28 March 1977 (aged 94); Melbourne, Victoria, Australia
- Occupation: Architect
- Buildings: Footscray Town Hall, St Kilda Synagogue

Joseph Plottel (1 January 1883 – 28 May 1977) was a British born architect who was active in Melbourne, Australia between 1911 and World War II. He worked in a range of revival styles, as well as Art Deco in the 1930s. He is best known for the St Kilda Synagogue (1927) and the Footscray Town Hall (1936).

== Early life and career ==
Plottel was born in Yorkshire in 1883 to Phillip Plottel, a jeweler who had likely recently arrived from eastern Europe, and Sarah. In 1888, Phillip migrated to Melbourne, joined in 1890 by Sarah and Joseph, settling in St Kilda, but after Phillip died young in 1893 they returned to Yorkshire. In 1899 he was articled to architect and surveyor Robert Moore of Middlesbrough, where he was advised to head for the colonies for advancement.

He migrated to South Africa in 1903, working in Pretoria, Cape Town and Johannesburg, then in 1907 he set out to travel to the United States where he saw prospects for architects after the 1906 San Francisco earthquake. He got as far as Melbourne, and had to find work to fund the rest of the journey. Here he was embraced by the local Jewish community and soon decided to stay, initially taking up a position with the Railway Engineering Department as a draftsman for about three years. He is said to have worked with fellow Jewish architect Nahum Barnet, and then set up his own office in 1910.

== Melbourne architectural practice ==
Plottel enjoyed a very diverse architectural practice over his 30 years of practice, with commercial, residential, industrial and civic projects in a range of styles, from the American Romanesque and Arts and Crafts movement to the Tudor Revival and Spanish Mission, and later Art Deco.

An early major commission was the Williamstown Municipal Buildings, completed in 1914, designed in a simplified Greek Revival style. He also designed several flat projects that were amongst the earliest in Melbourne, starting with Clarendon Flats, East Melbourne, 1912, and Garden Court, 1918 in Marne St South Yarra which were relatively severe designs in unadorned redbrick, whereas Clarendon Flats in St Kilda, 1915, was Arts & Crafts style.

The Jewish community provided many commissions, including several business people who had factories in Melbourne's Western Suburbs including Footscray and Yarraville.

In 1924 Plottel married Rachel, a doctor specialising in skin conditions. Their only daughter, Philippa May, obtained a Master of Laws at the University of Melbourne then went on to a prominent role in women's affairs and law, as a member of the National Council of Women of Victoria, the Victorian Women Lawyers Society, the Australian Local Government Women's Association Victoria and many other organisations. She married Rolf Hallenstein, whose family business was the large Michaelis Hallenstein tannery in Footscray.

In 1924 he was appointed to design the new St Kilda Synagogue, as the congregation had outgrown the 1872 building. As inspiration he presented a photo of the recently completed Temple Isaiah in Chicago, and his design was closely modelled on it, a smaller and simpler version of its exotic grand, domed, Byzantine Revival style. The dome roof was clad in green Wunderlich tiles, imitating copper, while the interior was finished in finely crafted woodwork, which was to become Plottel's trademark. The foundation stone of the new synagogue was laid 28 February 1926 (the contractor being H H Eilenberg) and the synagogue was consecrated on 13 March 1927. The Ladies' Gallery was also extended in 1957–1958 to designs by Plottel.

The Masonic Club, in the heart of the city at 164 to 170 Flinders Street, in 1927 again featured the extensive use of decorative brickwork, this time in a variation of the Neo Grec theme, showing the style's usual chaste ornament, formed by swags, antefixes and a shallow pediment.

Joseph Plottel was joined in a partnership by H E Bunnett (1891–1965) in 1921. Bunnett's son, Linsday Harold Bunnett (1920–1995), also joined Plottel's firm after matriculating at Scotch College in 1936, completing his articles in 1941.

Plottel established a brief practice in Canberra in the partnership of Plottel Bunnett & Alsop, who were commissioned to design a number of residential housing projects for the Capital Territory, one example of which survives at 5 Baudin Street dated to 1928 and showing a Mediterranean influence. The Canberra Electoral role for 1929 lists 'Plottel, Joseph architect 31 Queen St, Melbourne' by dint of his having purchased property in the territory.

In the late 1920s, like many architects, he undertook an overseas tour in 1929 to study the latest trends in both Europe and the United States, where he was impressed by the Spanish style houses of Pasadena and Beverly Hills.

== Main commissions ==
Further commissions then came in a series of factories, shops and commercial buildings in Melbourne and the inner suburbs, including Brash's at 108 Elizabeth Street in the late 1925, 'The Warwick' flats and shopfronts at 75A Fltzroy Street, cnr. Jackson Street, St Kilda (1933) in which Athol Shmith established his first photographic studio, while two Footscray factories for Maize Products, also in 1933, and Bradmills in 1934 cemented his reputation in that suburb. Bradmill's had previously been McPhersons Jute Works and Barnett Glass Rubber, but under the ownership of Bradford Cotton Mills the site was greatly extended with "Factory block No. 1" extensively reconstructed, in 1926–1927 according to Plottel's designs for a then massive £53,399.

He also carried out work on the Kayser Knitting Mill in 1933 and 1936 and Lamson Paragon's paper mill in Richmond in 1937, extending his repertoire with functional industrial buildings, still exhibiting finely executed decorative effects such as the use of coloured brickwork and terra cotta.

The Footscray connections led to the commission for the new Footscray Town Hall for the municipality. The two-storey building was designed in 1936, and erected by day labour under supervising contractors ARP Crow & Sons in 1936, to replace the first town hall built in 1875. It adopts an unusual eclectic Romanesque or even Byzantine mode, which had previously influenced Plottel for his St Kilda Synagogue, arranged in a formal Palladian manner with a central classical portico with attached receding wings either side. It is the only example of this style applied to a town hall in Victoria. The exterior incorporates a finely detailed entrance loggia with Corinthian columns, variegated brown brickwork highlighted with intricately modelled buff faience work and a terracotta tile mansard roof. It contains offices on the ground floor and the council chamber and reception hall on the upper level. The interior is designed in a contrasting Streamlined Modernist manner.

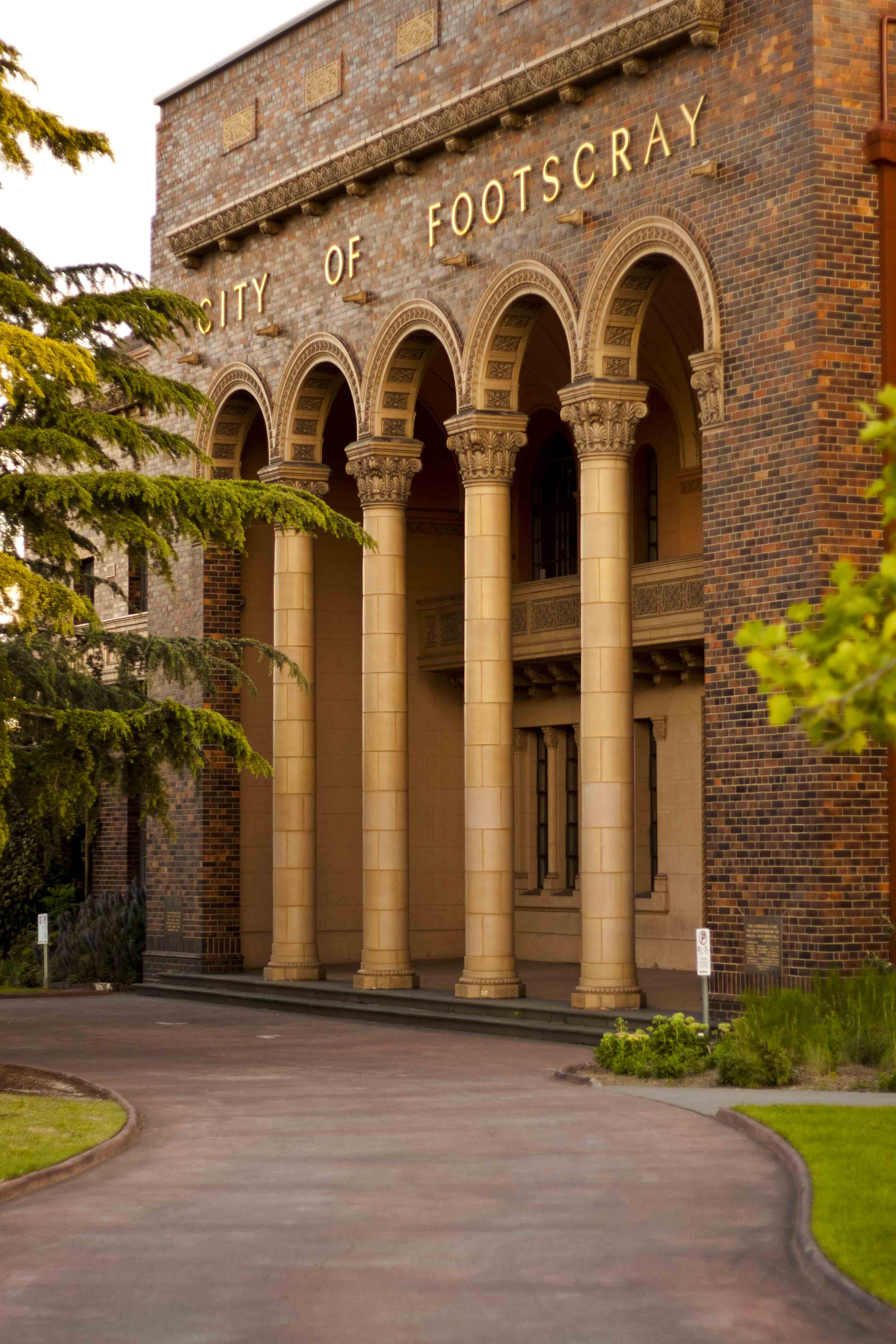
Footscray Town Hall

In the later 1930s, Plottel's work became increasingly Moderne, with examples such as the 1935 Beehive Building (92 to 94 Elizabeth Street Melbourne) and 1937 Yoffa House (187 Flinders Lane Melbourne) reflecting the Functionalist/Moderne style of the Interwar period. The Beehive building has been described as 'one of the most distinctive buildings in Melbourne', while Yoffa House is 'almost modern in concept, the Moderne note is sounded by the 'architectural terracotta' applied to the facade and the portholes intended for its walls' Further flat designs also came in the 1930s such 'Clovelly' at 136 Alma Road, St Kilda of 1938, featuring the Old English style which was a fashionable and romantic style for flats in the period 1919–1941, described as 'a cheery tonic after the rigours of the Great War.'

In 1937 Plottel was again engaged by the Jewish community to design the Temple Beth Israel in Alma Road, St Kilda. This building, like the Footscray substations, was almost modernistic, with little elaboration to the brickwork, though the tall square pillars of the portico still allude to the classical.

== Later life ==
In the late 1930s though Plottel's practice was busy, he took time off for nearly a year travelling again in 1938. In 1939, with the forced emigration of German and Austrian Jews, Joseph Plottel applied to be naturalised in 1939 (which hinted at an Austrian or Czechoslovak heritage), and sponsored a number of friends or relatives to escape from countries then controlled by Nazi Germany.

Plottel's last building appears to be a small speculative house venture in 1941, and though he briefly assisted with an extension to the Ladies' Gallery at the St Kilda Synagogue in 1957–1958, he appears to have lived out a quiet retirement before his death at his home in Toorak on 28 May 1977 aged 93. His wife Rachel Henrietta Plottel had died in Toorak two years previously on 2 January 1975, aged 88. Joseph's parents' names were given as Philip Plottel and Sarah Hyams, while Rachel Henrietta Plottel's Parents' names were given as Maurice Gross and Celine Isaacson.

== List of works ==
Plottel's works have been identified from the Art Deco Society article, architectural indexes, and original drawings in the State Library of Victoria collection.

- 586 Bourke Street, Melbourne, 1911 (demolished)
- Embank House, 325 Collins Street, 1911 (demolished)
- Clarendon Flats, 228 Clarendon Street, East Melbourne, 1912
- New floor, Grimes Lane, Melbourne, 1913 (with Reinforced Concrete and Monier Pipe Construction Co, demolished).
- Clarendon Flats, 26–28 Blessington Street, St Kilda, 1915
- Chilterns, 377 Glenferrie Road, 1917 (demolished)
- Garden Court, Marne St South Yarra, 1918
- Waverly, 115–119 Grey Street St. Kilda, 1920.
- Williamstown Municipal Offices, (Plottel & Bennett) 1919 (the hall was added in 1927 by other architects)
- Allens (confectionery) factory, 2 Byrne Street South Melbourne (South Bank), 1922 (demolished)
- Rebuilding of Alma Hotel, 32 Chapel Street, St Kilda East (now Dick Whittington Tavern), 1924
- Newport Masonic Hall, 405 Melbourne Road, Newport, 1924–1925
- Sandhurst Court flats, 101 Alma Rd, St Kilda East, 1925 (two separate blocks built in front of and behind a Victorian mansion)
- Brash's Music Store, 108 Elizabeth Street, 1925
- St Kilda Synagogue, 10 Charnwood Avenue, St Kilda, 1925–1927
- Masonic Club, 164-170 Flinders Street Melbourne, 1926.
- Manuka Arcade, Canberra, 1926
- Barnet Glass Rubber Co., 91 Moreland Street, Footscray
- Yarra Yarra Golf Club, East Bentleigh, 1927
- Flinders Way Arcade, 238 Flinders Lane (renovation), 1928
- Victoria Club, 141 Queen Street. Melbourne, 1928
- H V Nathan House, Trawalla Avenue, Toorak, 1932
- 'The Warwick' flats and shopfronts at 75A Fltzroy Street, St Kilda
- Venetian Court dining room, Hotel Australia Flinders Street. Melbourne, 1933 (demolished)
- Bathurst Apartments, 24 Queens Road Melbourne (remodelling, demolished) 1934
- Flats, 5 Moorakyne Avenue Malvern, 1934
- Plottel family home, 1 Evans Court, Toorak (developed with 'Redholme', a block of flats on the corner facing Toorak Road),1934
- Beehive Building, 92 to 94 Elizabeth Street Melbourne, 1935
- Footscray Town Hall, Napier Street, Footscray, 1936
- Yoffa House, 187 Flinders Lane, Melbourne, 1937 (now Adelphi Hotel)
- Lamson Paragon paper mill, Richmond, 1937
- Cross Street electricity substation, West Footscray, 1937
- House, Palm Grove, Deepdene, 1937
- Clovelly, 136 Alma Road, St Kilda 1937
- BYFAS spinning mills Abbotsford 1937
- Boys Home, Burwood, 1937. (demolished)
- Temple Beth Israel, 82 Alma Road, St Kilda, 1937 (front now rendered with infilled windows)
- Female block, Mount Royal Hospital Parkville, 1938.
- Brighton Theatre, Bay Street, Brighton, (alterations), 1940
- Air Raid Precautions Centre, 72 Buckley Street, Footscray, (later used as Footscray Library), 1941
- 122–128 Flinders Street Melbourne n.d, (demolished)
- 6-room house, 4 Maysia Street, Camberwell, 1941
- 625 Toorak Rd, Toorak
- 1 Evans Court, Toorak
