= Northcote Town Hall =

Community center in Melbourne, Australia

Coordinates: 37.774442°S 144.997478°E

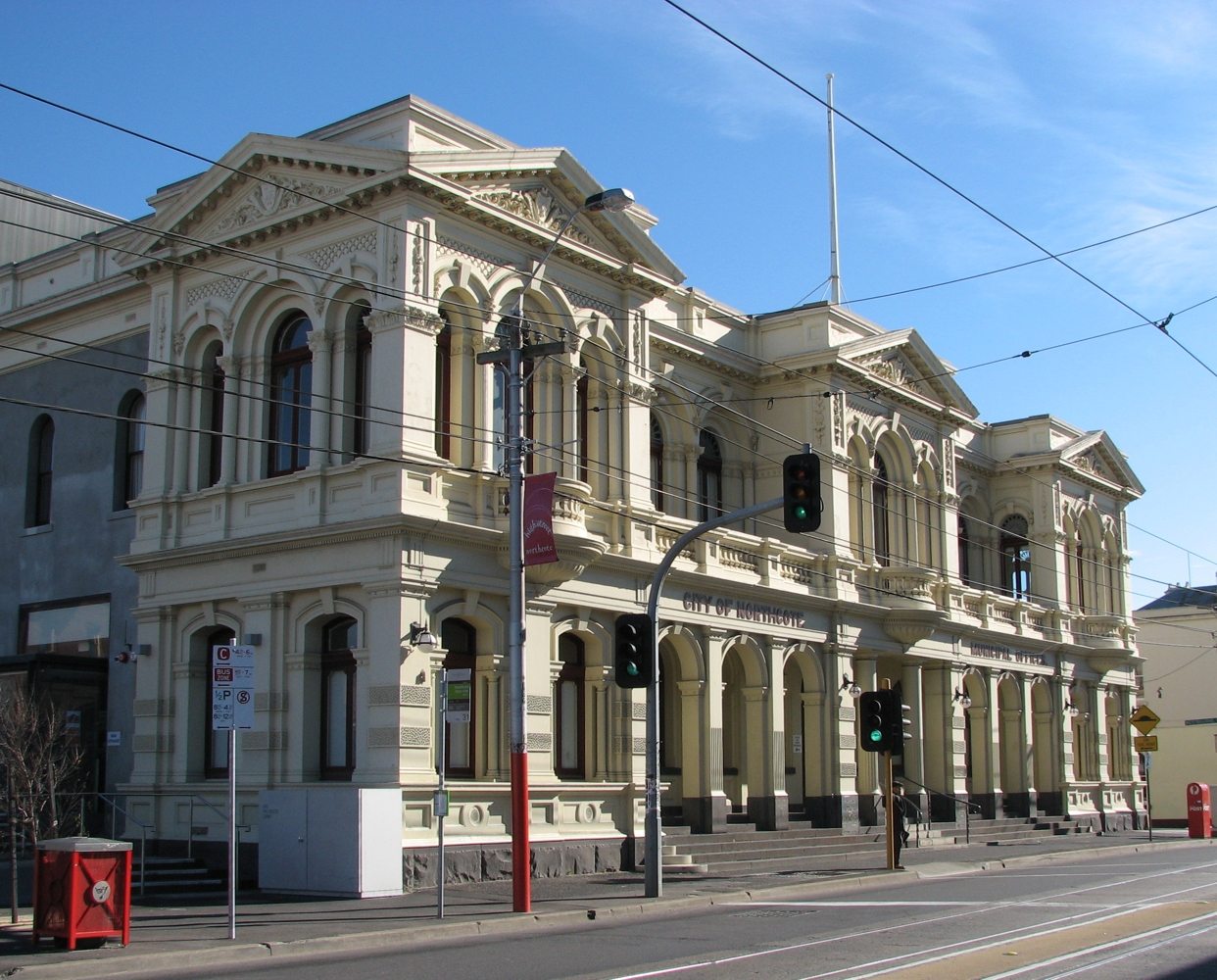
Northcote Town Hall

Northcote Town Hall Arts Centre is an arts and community centre located in High Street in Northcote, a suburb of Melbourne, Australia.

== History ==
The town hall was built in 1887 as the municipal offices and council chambers for the former City of Northcote. It was designed in the Classic Revival style by George Johnson. After the amalgamation of the City of Northcote with the City of Preston in 1994 to form the City of Darebin, the Town Hall was redeveloped and renovated into an arts, community and cultural venue. The present building comprises the original neoclassical building, an art deco extension housing the main hall, and modern expansion from 2006.

== Arts and Community centre ==
The centre now has seven meeting rooms for community meetings, training and passive recreation, two large studios for performances and events, a large main hall for functions and events seating up to 300 people and an outdoor civic square used for outdoor markets and performances.

As well as being used as a performance and conference space, many of the rooms are used for other purposes, such as for rehearsal groups, children's music groups, yoga and pilates.

== See also ==
- List of Town Halls in Melbourne
