= Metropolitan Meat Market =

Building in Melbourne, Australia

Coordinates: 37.801795°S 144.954053°E

- Metropolitan Meat Market
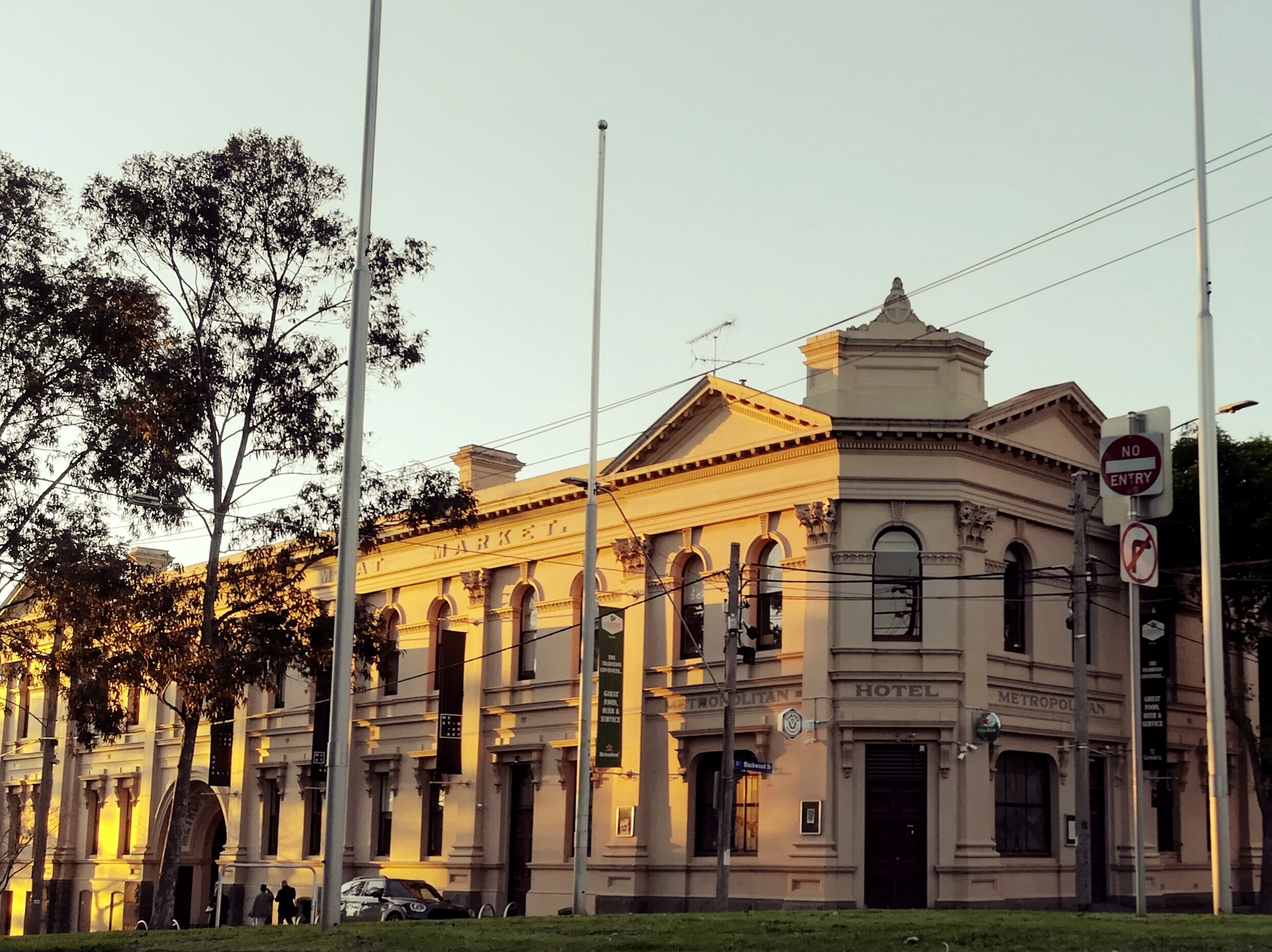
- Metropolitan Meat Market
- Former names: Metropolitan Meat Market, Meat Market Craft Centre
- Alternative names: Meat Market, North Melbourne Meat Market

General information
- Location: North Melbourne, 5 Blackwood Street, North Melbourne, Victoria, Australia
- Current tenants: City of Melbourne
- Completed: 1880
- Renovated: 2004
- Owner: Creative Victoria
- Landlord: Creative Victoria

Technical details
- Lifts/elevators: 1

Design and construction
- Architect: George Raymond Johnson
- Main contractor: City of Melbourne

Website
- www.meatmarket.org.au

Victorian Heritage Register
- Official name: Former Metropolitan Meat Market
- Type: Registered place
- Criteria: a, b, d, e, f
- Reference no.: VHR H0042
- Heritage Overlay Number: HO288
- Category: Retail and Wholesale

The Metropolitan Meat Market, also called the Meat Market, is a former market building that also incorporates the Metropolitan Hotel in North Melbourne, Victoria, Australia. It was designed by George Johnson and completed in 1880. It has been listed on the Victorian Heritage Register since 1973.

The venue has undergone many iterations and currently serves as an arts venue under the City of Melbourne. Annually, the venue hosts cultural and social events ranging from theatre, circus, dance to food and wine fairs, music launches and private functions, in addition to festivals including Melbourne Fringe Festival, RISING, and Yirramboi Festival.

== History ==
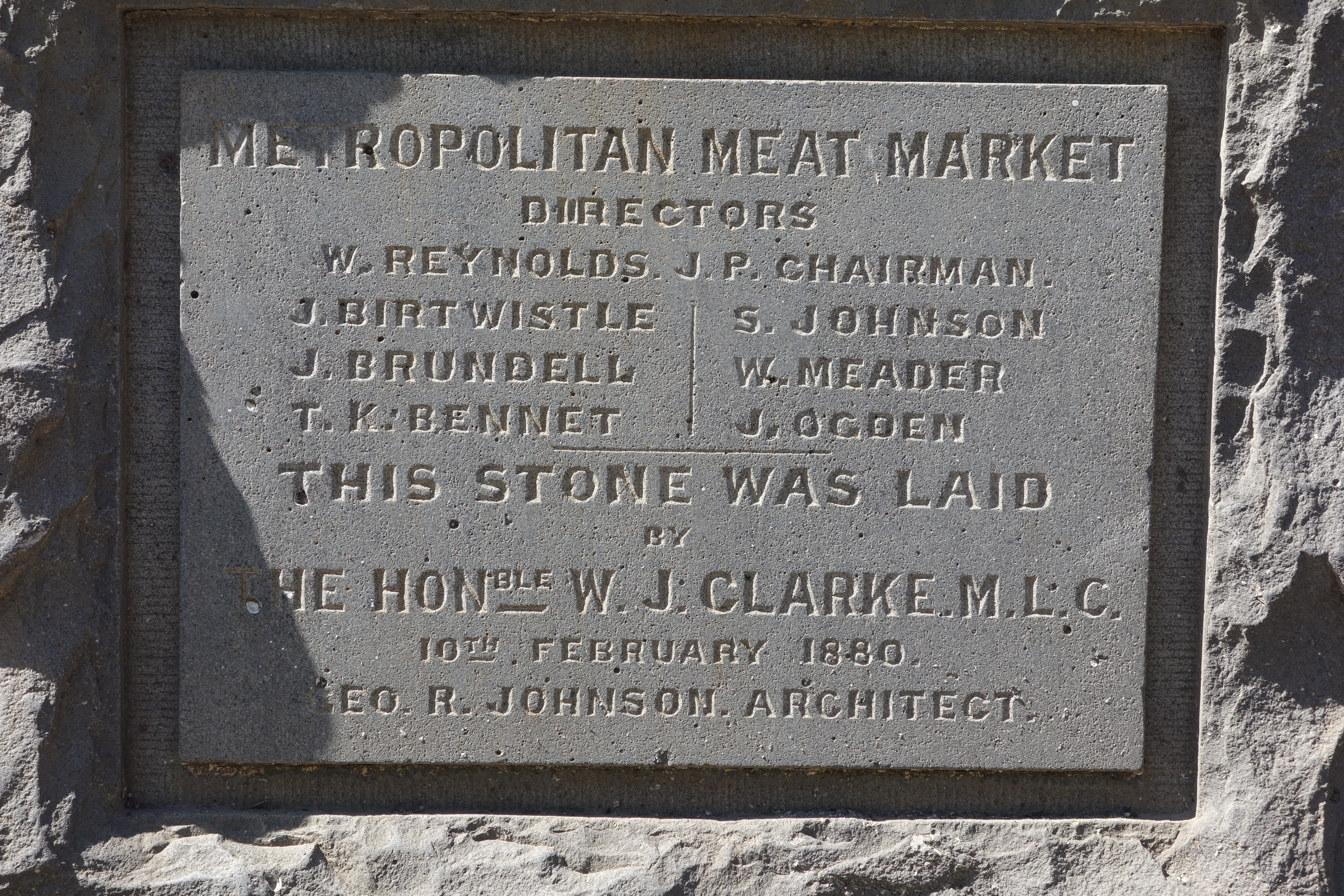
William John Clarke laid the foundation stone for the Metropolitan Meat Market in February 1880

Built in 1880, the Meat Market was originally conceived as a large-scale metropolitan trade space for meat vendors. The market ceased to trade in 1974. The building remained unused until 1977, when the property was acquired by the state government and transformed into an arts centre, inaugurated in 1979. The space functioned as an office and workshop with arts and craft organisations and artists. A 2004 refurbishment included more office space.

The City of Melbourne has developed the venue into a major arts and cultural space. Meat Market now houses over 50 individuals and arts businesses. Meat Market is an important hub for arts development and presentation within Melbourne’s arts scene, hosting hundreds of events each year including in Melbourne International Arts Festival, Melbourne Fringe Festival, Yirramboi and more.

== Current use ==
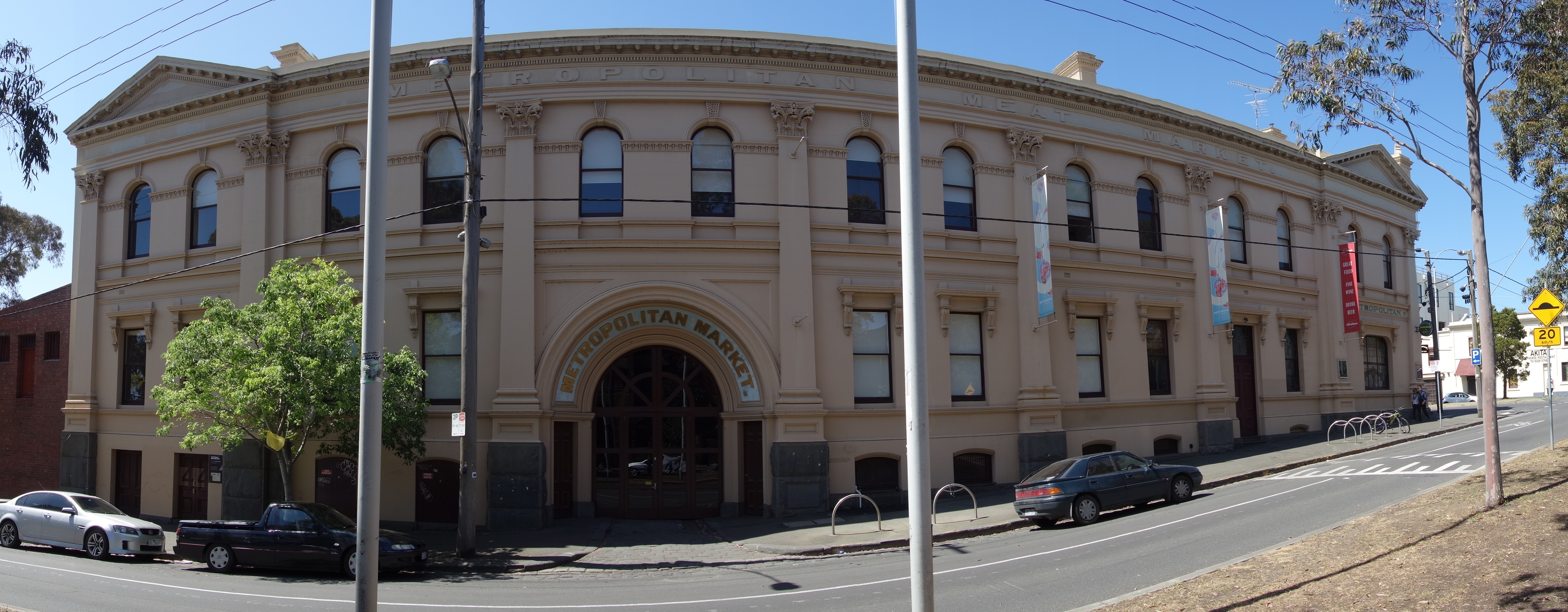
Meat Market in 2015

In 1998, Meat Market began being used as a creative and performing arts space. Followed by significant renovations in 2005, a dedicated management team was appointed in 2015. Now, over 50 businesses and individuals operate from the site. Meat Market has four spaces available for hire to the arts and the public, including the Flat Floor Pavilion, Cobblestone Pavilion, Meeting Room and Stables. Meat Market is also one of few venues for hire in Melbourne featuring a circus truss, accommodating aerial and circus performances in the Cobblestone Pavilion.

Meat Market also houses over 50 practitioners as 'licensees' - creative tenants which have a presence within the building. Licensees include a variety of creative outlets, including administrative offices for other arts organisations encompassing music and dance. Current and notable licensees include YIRRAMBOI Festival, Melbourne Jazz Festival and Wild at Heart.

== Notable events ==
- Emerald City as part of Melbourne Fringe Festival
- Junipalooza
- 7 May to 13 May 2018 - Melbourne Knowledge Week Hub
- Mould: A Cheese Festival
- 25 July 2018 - First MTV Unplugged Melbourne with Gang of Youths
- 26 July 2018 - Second MTV Unplugged Melbourne with Amy Shark
- 13 August 2018 - TedxMelbourne 2018: The Great Unknown
- 20 October 2018 - Broadsheet Melbourne and Connoisseur Ice Cream's Discovery Festival
- 23 to 25 November 2018 - Melbourne Music Week: Melbourne Synth Festival
