= George Raymond Johnson =

Australian architect

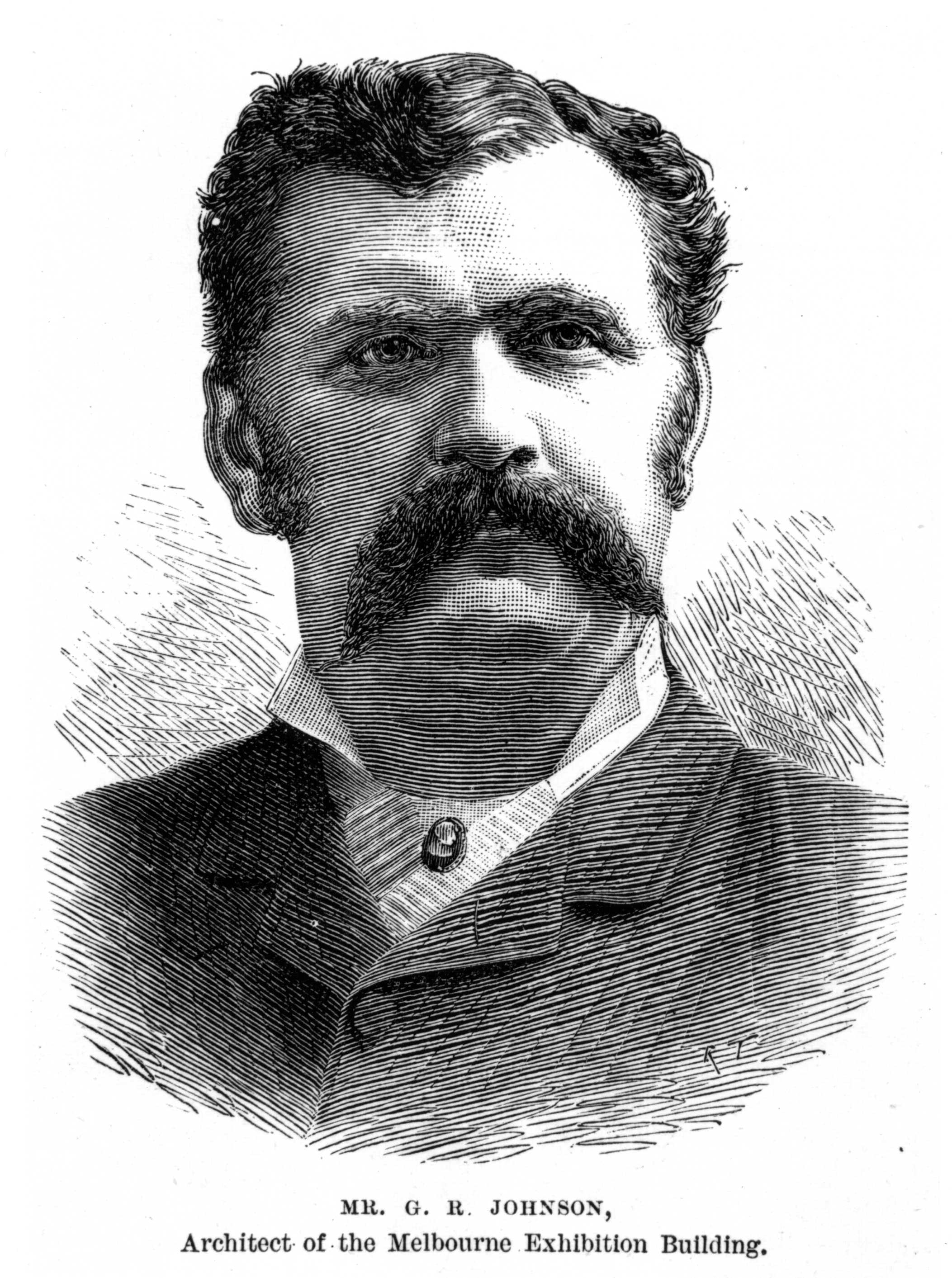

George Raymond Johnson (7 February 1840 – 25 November 1898) was an architect who practiced in late 19th century Melbourne and Perth, Australia. He is known for designing numerous important buildings, especially town halls and theatres.

== Biography ==
Johnson was born in Southgate, England and at age 13 began working with George Hall, Midland Railway architect. At 19 he moved to London, presumably to continue his architectural career. On 24 July 1862 he married Emma Louise Wood and, two days later, the couple embarked on a journey of emigration to Queensland. In 1867, Johnson moved to Melbourne, where he produced most of his major works. Following the bank crash in 1895 he moved to Perth, Western Australia, establishing a practice there. In 1898, while at sea returning to Melbourne, Johnson contracted sepsis, and died. One son, Harry Johnson (1867-1931), also became an architect.

== Architectural works ==
Johnson is known today for the design of a number of town halls across Victoria, notably the impressive Collingwood Town Hall, probably the most elaborate of the grand towered Second Empire style town halls that characterised the boom years of Melbourne in the 1880s. However he achieved most contemporary renown for his theatres in Melbourne, Sydney and Adelaide (perhaps as many as fifteen), now all demolished. Johnson's greatest contemporary acclaim came from his design for the extensive northern additions to Reed & Barnes's grand 1880 Exhibition Building for the Centennial Exhibition of 1888, removed soon after the Exhibition.

Johnson's major works, notably all the town halls and the theatres, were Renaissance Revival in style, and its variations including Free Classical, Italianate, Second Empire or Mannerist. Many were designed "with bold and rich character from Johnson's mannerist palette, an idiom in which he was a master." A few projects adopted different styles, such as the first building for the Hospital for Incurables, now the Austin Hospital, Heidelberg (1881, demolished), which was Venetian Gothic in character, in polychrome brick, while his bluestone cottages for the Old Colonists Home in North Fitzroy (1870) were Gothic.

A selection of Johnson's notable buildings are listed below. For a complete list of known works, see the database compiled by Johnson's descendant, architect Peter Johnson, included in Pride of Hotham (Hannan, 2006).

Building	Location	Year	Type	Note	
Old Colonists Home	North Fitzroy	1870	cottages	extant	View of first OCAV cottage (1870) designed by George Raymond Johnson architect.
Holdsworth (Daley) Building	378-382 Lygon Street, Carlton	1871	shops	rear wings removed and front sections restored 1984	380 Lygon Street, Carlton
Prince of Wales Opera House	Bourke Street, Melbourne, Victoria,	1872	theatre	demolished 1900	
Eastern Arcade	Bourke Street, Melbourne, Victoria	1872	retail	modified 1894, demolished 2008	
North Melbourne Town Hall	North Melbourne, Victoria	1876	town hall	Now trading as Arts House	View from corner of Queensberry & Errol Streets taken 30 March 2010 at 3.29 pm
Theatre Royal, Adelaide	Hindley Street, Adelaide	1878	theatre	demolished 1962	View of Hindley Street in ca.1890
New German Club, Adelaide	87–91 Pirie Street, Adelaide	1878	Clubhouse & theatre	substantially modified after 1899	
Metropolitan Meat Market	North Melbourne, Victoria	1880	commercial	Now an Arts Hub, trading as Meat Market	Image on specifications cover
Austin Hospital for Incurables	Heidelberg, Victoria	1882	other	demolished c1970	
Cathedral Hotel (1882/83),	Swanston Street, north east corner of Flinders Lane, Melbourne	1883	hotel	demolished c1970	
Daylesford Town Hall	Daylesford, Victoria	1882	town hall		Vincent Street elevation published in Australasian Sketcher, 16 January 1884, p5
Collingwood Town Hall	Collingwood, Victoria	1885	town hall		
Criterion Theatre	Cnr Pitt and Park streets, Sydney	1886	theatre	demolished 1935	
Centennial Exhibition Annexes to Exhibition Building	Carlton, Victoria	1887	other	demolished 1889	Wood engraving published in Australasian Sketcher, 9 August 1888, p120
Northcote Town Hall	Northcote, Victoria	1887	town hall		
Fitzroy Town Hall additions	Fitzroy, Victoria	1887	municipal offices, library, courthouse & clock tower		
Maryborough Town Hall	Maryborough, Victoria	1887	town hall		
Bijou Theatre	Bourke Street, Melbourne, Victoria	1889	theatre	demolished 1934	View of stage & proscenium
"Battle of Waterloo" Cyclorama	55 Victoria Parade, Fitzroy	1889	entertainment	demolished 1927	Battle of Waterloo Cyclorama
Kilmore Town Hall	Kilmore, Victoria	1894	town hall		
Theatre Royal (auditorium only)	Hay Street, Perth	1897	theatre	interior now shops, exterior survives	Audience at the reception held at the Theatre Royal in Perth for the Australian cricket team
City Baths, Perth	Esplanade, Perth	1898	sea baths	demolished 1920	City Baths on the Perth Esplanade in about 1900.
