= Brunswick Progress Association =

The Brunswick Progress Association is a community organisation active in the City of Merri-bek Council area, and in particular the suburbs of Brunswick and Coburg, inner northern suburbs of Melbourne, Victoria, Australia. It was first established in 1905 and celebrated its centenary of community activism in 2005.

== History ==
The movement to form a Town Association (Progress) began early in 1905 in reaction to the non-responsiveness of the Brunswick Council to the concerns of residents. It was the first such body established in the Melbourne metropolitan area. It is likely the Brunswick Progress Association was the second one established in Australia, as a progress association was established at Ballarat in 1904.

Australian Labor Party State Member of Parliament, and later Federal member for the seat of Bourke, Frank Anstey (1865-1940), was elected on the first Executive Committee of the Brunswick Town Association (Progress). Anstey had a long association with the organisation until his death in 1940. Maurice Blackburn succeeded Frank Anstey as Federal representative for the seat of Bourke and also maintained an active interest in the affairs of the Brunswick Progress Association.

In the cold war atmosphere of 1953 the Brunswick Council passed a resolution not to enter into any correspondence with any person who is a communist or communist sympathiser. In council elections in 1954 the Mayor and several councillors were defeated and in a meeting of Council the 'Anti-red law' was rescinded 18 votes to 4.

In 1965 the Progress Association was at a low ebb of activity. Two new members, Vic Little and Vida Little, enlivened the organisation, which steadily grew in members as campaigns were launched on local issues and concerns of residents.

In the 1960s and 1970s, the Association was very active in opposition to the proposed F2 Freeway along the Merri Creek, ran a successful campaign for clean air, as Brunswick was then said to be the second most polluted city in Victoria. The clean air campaign in the 1960s was instrumental in establishing the Victorian Environment Protection Authority in 1972.

In 1971 the Brunswick Progress Association combined with the West Brunswick Progress Association to object significantly to council plans to demolish the Mechanics' Institute, which was built in 1868. The National Trust also objected and the Mechanics' Institute was saved from the wreckers.

In 1973, the Association was active in opposing council plans to demolish the Brunswick Town Hall on Sydney Road and replace it with a five story Civic Centre, costing in excess of $2 million. The Council plans were stopped with a poll of residents resulting in a no vote won by seven to one.

In 1975 the Brunswick Progress Association instituted a campaign to get a Community Health Centre complex, the Brunswick City Council opposed it, the Centre was won with wide support from the community. The Merri-bek Community Health Service is now a multimillion-dollar community organisation servicing the health needs of the residents of the City of Merri-bek, with major centres on Glenlyon Road in Brunswick, and Bell street in Coburg.

Other campaigns included:

- the condition of Sydney Road
- Nicholson Street tram route extension
- the fight for half rates for pensioners throughout Victoria
- the fight to put the Richmond-Brunswick Power line underground
- the struggle to keep the Upfield railway line open
- campaigns against many factories working at night affecting residents sleep
- support for Friends of the ABC
- opposition to uranium mining in Jabiluka in the Northern Territory
- support for public housing, public transport
- support for Aboriginal land rights
- opposition to privatisation of public utilities
- support for tax reform and opposition to the Goods and Services Tax

The Association met at the now-demolished Clarrie Wohlers Citizens' Centre, Fleming Park, on the corner of Albert and Cross Streets, East Brunswick.
