= Borough of Flemington and Kensington =

- Local government area
- The extent of the Borough of Flemington and Kensington at its dissolution in 1905
- Country: Australia
- State: Victoria
- Established: 1882
- Abolished: 1905
- Council seat: Kensington

Area
  - Total: 4.7 km^{2} (1.8 sq mi)
- County: Bourke

The Borough of Flemington and Kensington was a local government area in Victoria, Australia, centred on the Melbourne suburbs of Flemington and Kensington.

It was proclaimed on 17 March 1882, separating Flemington and Kensington from the Municipality of Essendon and constituting it as its own municipality.

The Kensington Town Hall (originally the Flemington and Kensington Town Hall was opened in 1901 as the new municipal headquarters.

It ceased to exist on 30 October 1905, when both the Borough of Flemington and Kensington and the adjacent Town of North Melbourne were amalgamated into the City of Melbourne as the new Hopetoun Ward.
