= Town of North Melbourne =

- Local government area
- The extent of the Town of North Melbourne at its dissolution in 1905
- Country: Australia
- State: Victoria
- Established: 1859
- Abolished: 1905
- Council seat: North Melbourne

Area
  - Total: 2.4 km^{2} (0.93 sq mi)
- County: Bourke

The Town of North Melbourne was a local government area in Victoria, Australia, taking in the suburb of North Melbourne.

It was first proclaimed on 30 September 1859 as the Municipality of Hotham, reflecting the original name of the suburb of North Melbourne, separating what had been the Hotham Ward of the City of Melbourne as its own municipality. The original boundaries were Victoria Street, Elizabeth Street and Flemington Road.

It became the Borough of Hotham on 14 October 1863 following statewide municipal reforms and was proclaimed a town on 18 December 1874, becoming the Town of Hotham. The council petitioned the state government to change the name to North Melbourne at this time, but were refused.

The now heritage-listed North Melbourne Town Hall opened in 1876 as the new municipal headquarters.

It was renamed the Town of North Melbourne on 26 August 1887. It ceased to exist on 30 October 1905, when both the Town of North Melbourne and the adjacent Borough of Flemington and Kensington were again amalgamated into the City of Melbourne as the new Hopetoun Ward. The town's final mayor was Stephen Barker of the Australian Labor Party, who was elected in September 1905 but failed to win election to the Melbourne City Council after amalgamation.
