= Footscray Town Hall =

Civic building in Melbourne, Australia

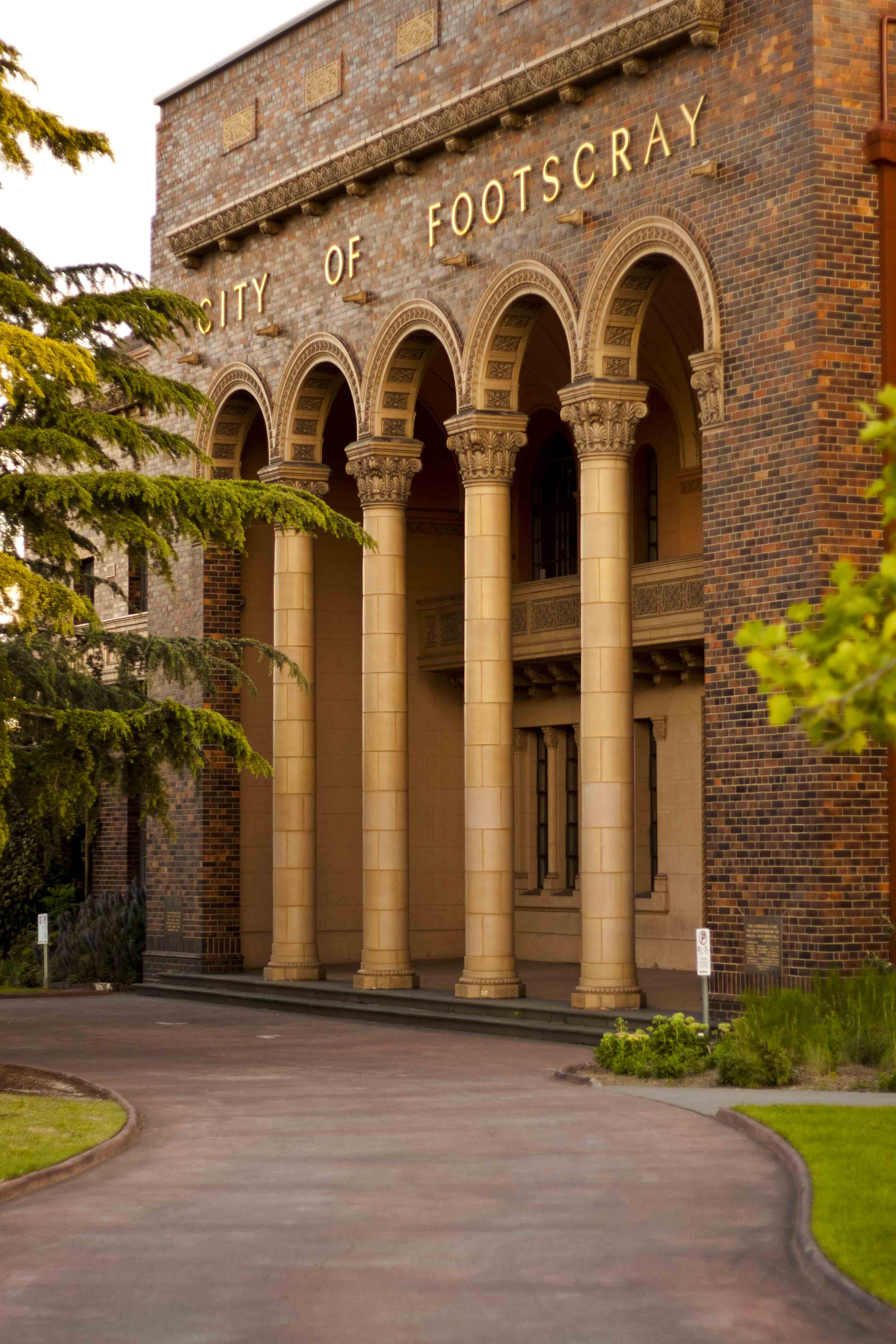
- Footscray Town Hall, in 2011
- Interactive map of the Footscray Town Hall area
- Alternative names: Maribyrnong Town Hall

General information
- Status: Completed
- Type: Town hall
- Architectural style: Richardsonian Romanesque revival; Streamline Moderne
- Location: Napier Street, Footscray, Melbourne, Victoria, Australia
- Coordinates: 37°48′17″S 144°54′02″E
- Groundbreaking: 22 February 1936
- Completed: 1936; 90 years ago
- Opened: 19 November 1936
- Renovated: 1984; 2025
- Cost: A£40,000
- Renovation cost: A$1.5 million (1984); A$39 million (2025)
- Client: City of Footscray
- Owner: City of Maribyrnong

Technical details
- Material: Bricks; tiles; marble; timber

Design and construction
- Architect: Joseph Plottel
- Main contractor: A. R. P. Crow & Sons

Renovating team
- Architect: DesignInc (2025)

Victorian Heritage Register
- Official name: Maribyrnong Town Hall
- Type: Registered place
- Designated: 21 November 1996
- Reference no.: H1215
- Heritage overlay no.: HO54
- Category: Community Facilities

The Footscray Town Hall, also known as the Maribyrnong Town Hall since council amalgamations in the 1990s, is a civic building located on Napier Street in Footscray, an inner-western suburb of Melbourne, in Victoria, Australia. Built in 1936 as the town hall for the City of Footscray, it was designed by Joseph Plottel in a revival form of the Richardsonian Romanesque style, with the interior completed in the Streamline Moderne style. The 1936 civic building replaced the previous town hall on the same site, which was demolished in 1935. The building has served as the main council chambers of the City of Maribyrnong since 1993.

The building was added to the Victorian Heritage Register on 21 November 1996 in recognition of its architectural, aesthetic, social and historical significance.

== History ==
The first town hall for the City of Footscray was a sombre, staid and grey bluestone building with a narrow entrance, erected in 1875, that was, in the 1930s, becoming dilapidated.

Following the Great Depression, the City of Footscray emerged as a progressive manufacturing location, with the largest revenue of any Victorian city, excluding the City of Melbourne. Plans for a new progressive brick structure, located on the site of the existing municipal offices, were approved by Council in August 1935 and the foundation stone was laid by the Mayor on 22 February 1936. The building was opened by the Governor of Victoria Lord Huntingfield, on 19 November 1936 in front of 5,000 people.

In 1984, a $1.5 million extension to the town hall, including offices and ancillary services was completed. A further $39 million development was completed in 2025 that demolished most of the 1984 structures, repurposed the 1936 building ground floor for public and community use, maintained the first floor for council administration, added an additional contemporary and sympathetic wing for administrative use, and completed a new community park.

== Description ==
Designed by Joseph Plottel in an imposing 20th-century Romanesque Revival style with grand civic proportions, the A£40,000 town hall was constructed of materials made in Australia. The specially selected bricks were variegated in warm colours ranging from browns to red. Buff architectural terracotta featured in the main portico, columns, balconies, arches and elsewhere where accents of colour were necessary. Under the portico of Corinthian columns there was a barrel-vaulted ceiling. The bronzed front doors led to a large entrance lobby embellished with a mosaic floor that incorporated the City’s coat of arms as a centrepiece. With more than 16,000 pieces of tile, The Age described it as ‘one of the best examples of mosaic to be seen around Melbourne’. The patterned floor extended under the revolving door to the main stair hall containing black marble columns. Extending to the right and left the main corridor gave access to the counters of the electrical supply department, the rates office and the town clerk’s general office.

A black and white marble elliptical shaped stairway with bronze handrailing led to the first floor level. The city’s huge honour board commemorating some 2,000 local citizens who served in World War I, stood floor to ceiling at the top of the stairway. It had been transferred to its imposing new position from the old municipal offices, and was illuminated by the decorative stairwell windows as well as by the soft tones of the amber-coloured lighting in the upper corridor. On this level the council chamber, the Mayor and Mayoress’s suites, committee rooms as well as the surveyor’s and engineer’s offices were to the west end, while the supper room with associated facilities and its own separate stairway could be found at the east end. Most of these rooms faced the front of the building and opened on to a balcony faced with terracotta.

The council chamber had been designed with a special ceiling and acoustically treated walls. Like other parts of the building it was lined with flush wood panelling of selected grain. At the other end of the corridor the banquet hall, which was to be let for dances, socials and weddings had its own terrazzo staircase paved in marble effect. This room was entered by wide doors ‘of ornamental frosted glass inlet in polished maple frames’. The walls were covered in beige in a sand paper finish, and decorated with a raised ornamental frieze in green and gold. Subtle, overhead, indirect lighting was used. To one side was a little alcove for small orchestras, to the other a kitchen.

The elegant pair of double lamps that stand in front of the building are similar to another pair of lamps which stand at the east (Hyde Street) entrance. The drinking fountain and horse trough—gifted in 1891 in celebration of Footscray being proclaimed a city—were moved from the centre of the Napier Street frontage to the east side of the new town hall in Hyde Street.

== See also ==
- List of town halls in Melbourne
- Architecture of Melbourne
- List of places on the Victorian Heritage Register in the City of Maribyrnong
