= Coburg City Hall =

Town hall in Melbourne, Australia

Coordinates: 37.740933°S 144.969047°E

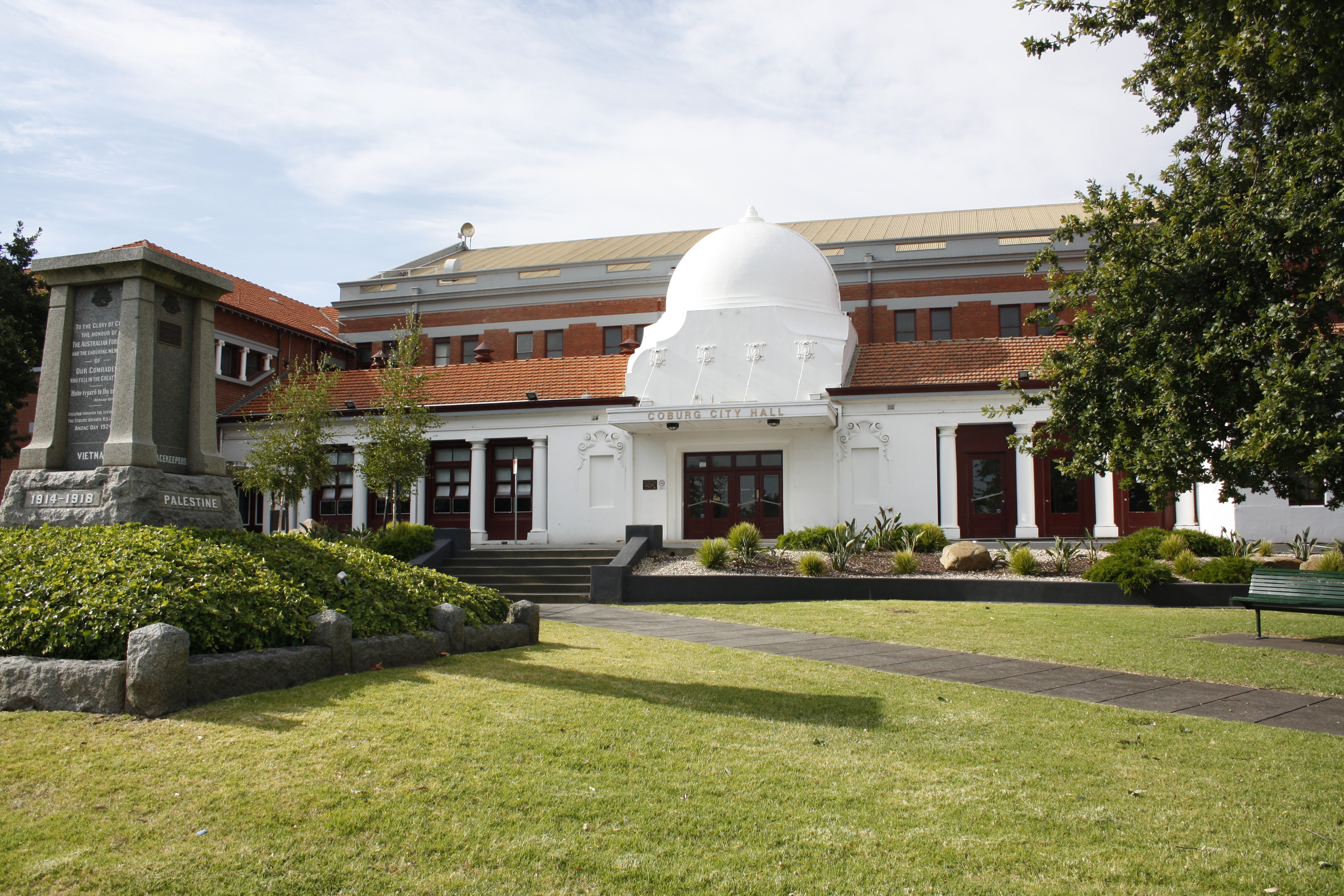
Coburg Town Hall

The Coburg Town Hall, formerly the Town Hall of the City of Coburg, is located on Bell Street, Coburg, Melbourne, Australia.

The original building, designed by the architect Charles Heath and built by Cockram & Cooper, consisted of a white dome and two wings (each with a hall). It was officially opened on 1 April 1922, by the Earl of Stradbroke, and Mayor W.E. Cash. The foundation stone reads: "Built in honour of those who served in the Great War 1914-18". The stone on the Eastern Wing (now near the new office extension) reads: "C.E. Williams for efforts to establishing a free Public Library in Coburg. 30 June 1923".

The Coburg Town Hall had the first installed, Australian-designed and constructed film projection unit (Raycophone) in 1930. At the opening night Mayor Cr. Campbell read letters from the Premier and Prime Minister Scullin who wrote: "If similar steps were taken extensively the present depression would be vastly relieved". It is also reported that the dome at the front of the theatre used to show a neon sign saying "Talkies" until the late 1940s.

On the corner of Elm and Urquhart Street is the "Coburg City Band and Truby King Rooms". The foundation stone was laid on 10 October 1925 by Sir Truby King, and completed on 24 July 1926, with a keystone laid by Mayor Cr. J. Robinson. It was designed by D.McC.Dawnson C.E. and now houses the Elm Grove Infant Welfare Centre.

After the amalgamation of the City of Coburg with the City of Brunswick and the southern portion of the City of Broadmeadows in 1994 to form the City of Moreland, the City Hall became the corporate headquarters of the new Moreland City Council (now City of Merri-bek). Following the amalgamation, the City Hall was extended from Bell Street through to Urquhart Street, and included additional function rooms built in 2000.
