= North Melbourne Town Hall =

Listed building in Victoria, Australia

Coordinates: 37.803342°S 144.94959°E

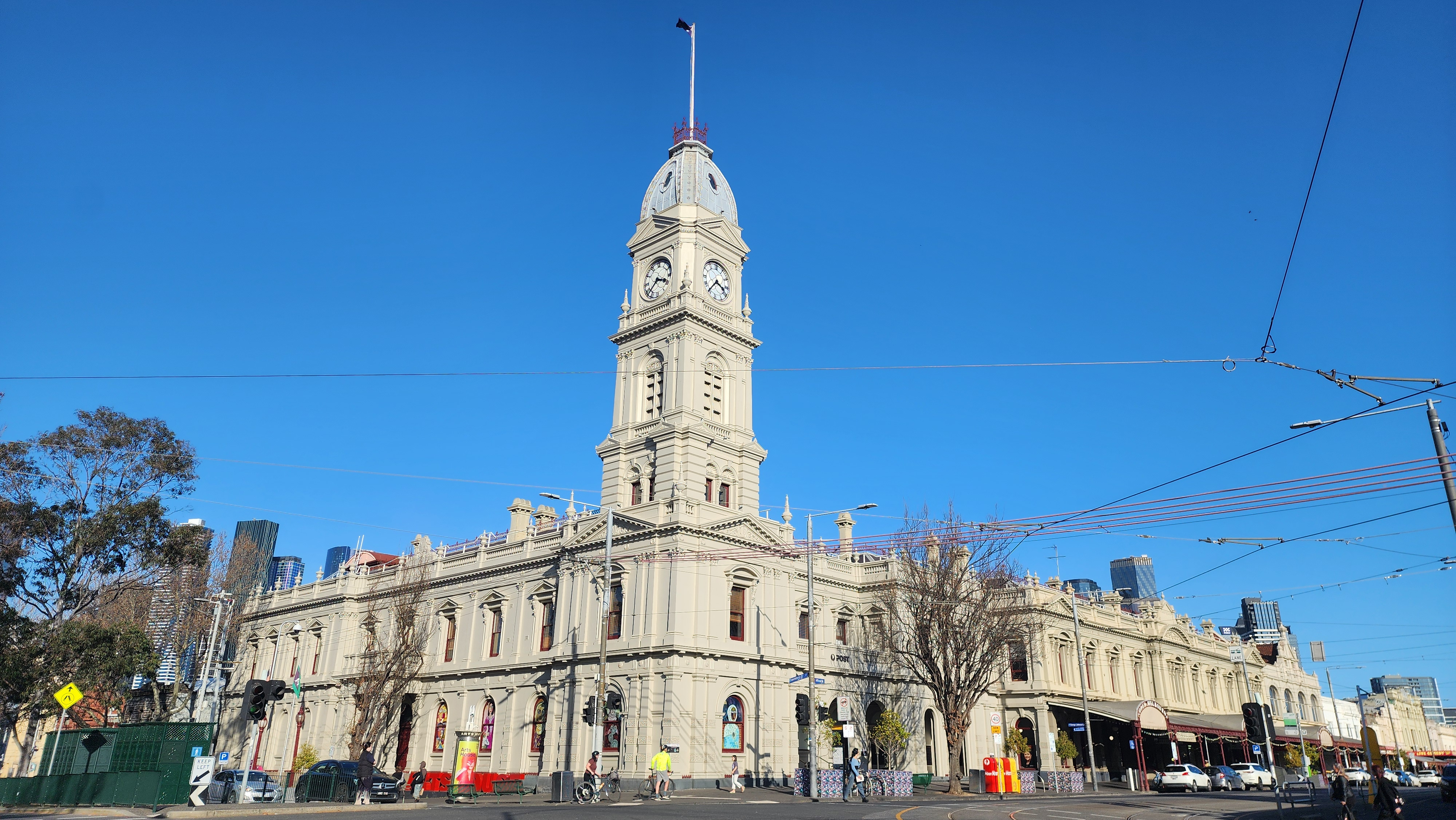

North Melbourne Town Hall is the former town hall of the Town of North Melbourne (originally the Town of Hotham) in Victoria, Australia. It was listed on the former Register of the National Estate on 21 March 1978 and on the Victorian Heritage Register on 11 March 2010.

It was built in 1876 as the town hall for the Town of North Melbourne, and operated in that capacity until the municipality amalgamated into the City of Melbourne in 1905. It thereafter continued to serve as a venue for public meetings and was used for various community purposes. It now houses Arts House, a contemporary arts space, and the North Melbourne Library.

It is located on the corner of Errol and Queensberry Streets.

== History ==
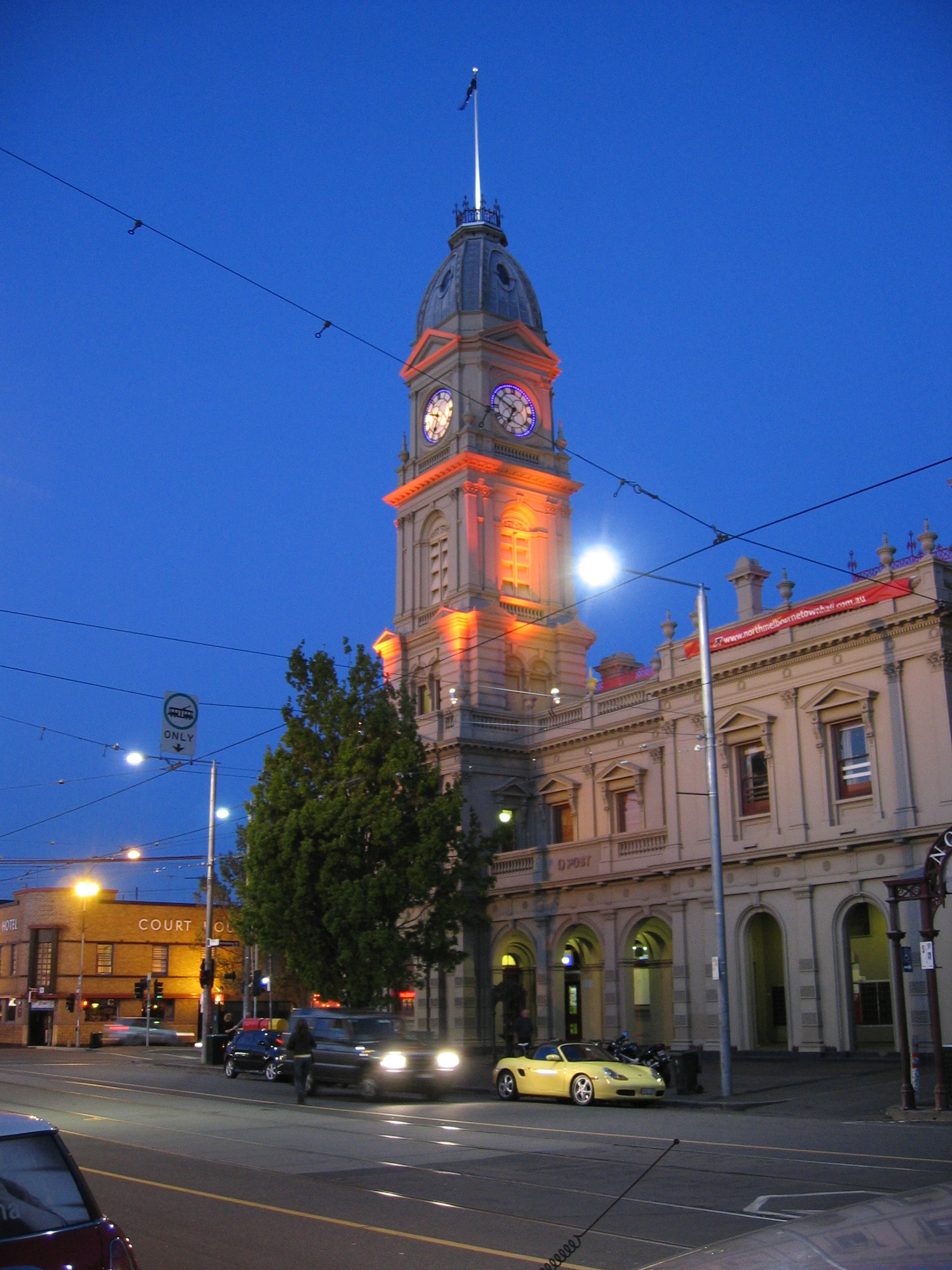
North Melbourne Town Hall at night.

The Town Hall, built in 1876, was designed by Architect George Raymond Johnson, in the Italianate with Second Empire elements style of Victorian architecture. He also designed the Collingwood, Daylesford, Fitzroy, Kilmore, Maryborough and Northcote Town Halls.

A cast-iron drinking fountain, donated by Hotham mayor, Thomas Henderson, on the footpath nearby the hall features an ornamental kangaroo and is registered by the National Trust of Victoria.

The Town of North Melbourne amalgamated into the City of Melbourne in 1905, and the town hall thereafter became the "North Melbourne municipal buildings", with only a skeleton municipal staff remaining. It continued to be used for public meetings, although the Melbourne council imposed significant restrictions on Sunday gatherings and imposed an expensive deposit in 1906, resulting in local complaints. It was leased to the Department of Defence as offices from 1918 to 1922, with the Railways Department also occupying a section of the building from around 1920 to 1922. It reopened to the public in December 1922.

The former town hall has housed Arts House, an arts organisation run by the City of Melbourne, since 1996. The building serves as both administrative offices for the organisation and a contemporary arts space. It also continues to house the North Melbourne Library in the northern section of the building.

== See also ==
- List of Town Halls in Melbourne
