= Kensington Town Hall, Melbourne =

Building in Victoria, Australia

Coordinates: 37°47′22″S 144°55′43″E

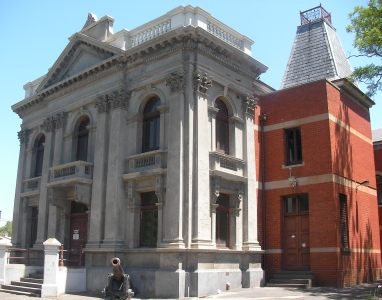
Kensington Town Hall from forecourt

Kensington Town Hall is a former municipal hall in Kensington, Victoria, Australia.

The classical style building, located in Bellair Street was first constructed in 1901.

During World War II, it was used as a command post. It served as a legal centre in the 1980s.

It is heritage listed and currently operates as a community centre, dance and ballet school.

The building is currently being restored, with work being done to preserve the facade and foundations of the building.

The restored building was officially reopened by the Lord Mayor of Melbourne Robert Doyle on 28 February 2015, after a $4.8 million renovation.

== See also ==
- List of town halls in Melbourne
- City of Melbourne
