= Flemington Police Station =

Heritage-listed police station in Melbourne, Victoria, Australia

- Location within Melbourne
- Interactive map of the Flemington Police Station area

General information
- Status: Completed
- Type: Police station and lock-up
- Architectural style: Eclectic; Victorian Italianate; Victorian Byzantine; Lombardic Romanesque
- Location: 30 Wellington Street, Flemington, Melbourne, Victoria, Australia
- Coordinates: 37°47′07″S 144°55′55″E
- Current tenants: Victoria Police
- Year built: 1890–1891
- Completed: 1891; 135 years ago
- Cost: £606
- Client: Victorian Colonial Government

Technical details
- Material: Red bricks; slate; limestone; bluestone
- Floor count: 2

Design and construction
- Architect: Alexander J. MacDonald
- Architecture firm: Public Works Department
- Main contractor: F. S. Warner

Website
- police.vic.gov.au

Victorian Heritage Register
- Official name: Flemington Police Station and Lock-up
- Type: Registered place
- Designated: 6 February 1991
- Reference no.: H0844
- Heritage overlay no.: HO123
- Category: Law Enforcement

The Flemington Police Station is a police station of the Victoria Police, located at 30 Wellington Road, Flemington, an inner-western suburb of Melbourne, in Victoria, Australia.

The police station and its associated lock-up were added to the Victorian Heritage Register on 6 February 1991.

== Description ==
The Flemington Police Station and Lock Up form part of a complex of public buildings designed by A. J. McDonald for the Public Works Department. The building was designed in an eclectic mix of Victorian Italianate, Victorian Byzantine, and Lombardic Romanesque styles, sometimes described as an Australian interpretation of American Romanesque architecture. The tendered contract was awarded to F. S. Warner for the sum of £606.

The Flemington Police Station, designed in 1890, and the Lock Up, designed in 1891, comprise a group of picturesque and unusual buildings which, together with the adjoining Flemington Court House – both major contributors to an important 19th century streetscape – form an outstanding group of public buildings designed by McDonald under the supervision of J. T. Kelleher. The police station and lock up are substantially intact and an excellent example of the "battle of styles" that marked a highpoint in the development of architectural importance by the government department.

The heritage-listed post office building, also on Wellington Street, is within close proximity of the court house and police buildings, completed in complementary styles.

The Flemington Police Station has been in continual use since the 1890s.

== See also ==
- Flemington Court House
- Flemington Post Office
- List of places on the Victorian Heritage Register in the City of Moonee Valley
