= Capo Gallo Lighthouse =

Lighthouse in Sicily, Italy

Capo Gallo
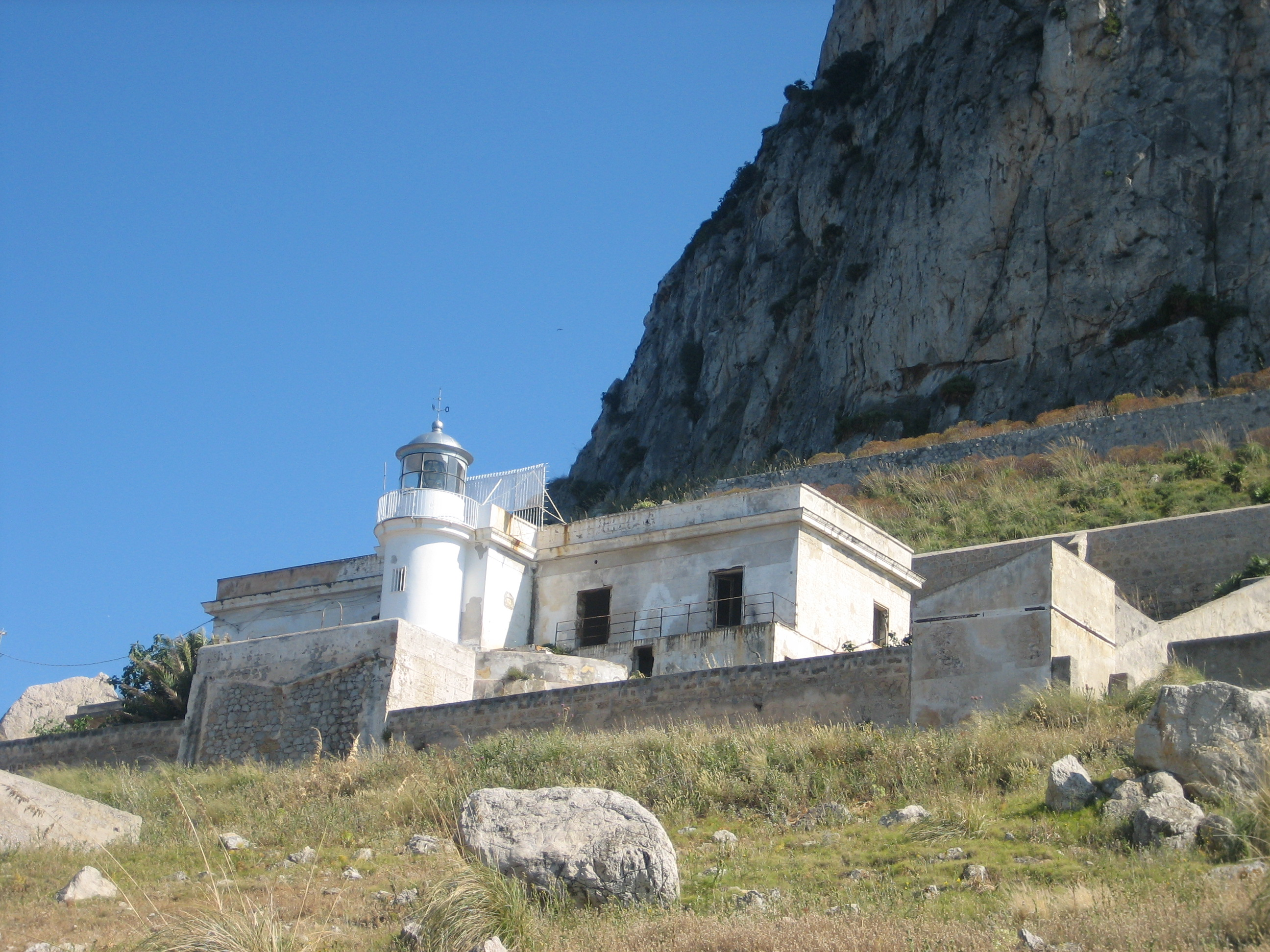
- Capo Gallo Lighthouse
- Location: Capo Gallo; Sicily; Italy
- Coordinates: 38°13′25″N 13°19′00″E

Tower
- Constructed: 1854
- Foundation: concrete base
- Construction: concrete tower
- Height: 7 metres (23 ft)
- Shape: cylindrical tower with balcony and lantern attached to the sea side 1-storey keeper's house
- Markings: white tower and lantern, grey metallic lantern dome
- Power source: mains electricity
- Operator: Marina Militare

Light
- Focal height: 40 metres (130 ft)
- Lens: Type OF 800; Focal length: 400 mm
- Intensity: main: AL 100 W reserve: LABI 100 W
- Range: mains: 16 nautical miles (30 km; 18 mi) reserve: 13 nautical miles (24 km; 15 mi)
- Characteristic: L Fl (2) W 15s.
- Italy no.: 3198 E.F.

Capo Gallo Lighthouse (Italian: Faro di Capo Gallo) is an active lighthouse located on the northern tip of the promontory of Monte Pellegrino and marks the western entrance to the Gulf of Palermo, Sicily on the Tyrrhenian Sea.

== Description ==
The lighthouse, built in 1854, consists of a cylindrical tower, 7 metres (23 ft) high, with balcony and lantern attached to the seaward 1-storey keeper's house. The building, after the automation of the lighthouse, went into ruin. In 2016, the Municipality of Palermo reportedly revisited plans to turn the lighthouse into a structure open to the public or museum as it is part of the Nature Reserve of Capo Gallo.

The tower and the lantern are painted white; the lantern dome grey metallic. The lantern is positioned at 40 metres (130 ft) above sea level and emits two long white flashes in a 15 seconds period visible up to a distance of 16 nautical miles (30 km; 18 mi). The lighthouse is completely automated and managed by the Marina Militare with the identification code number 3198 E.F.

== See also ==
- List of lighthouses in Italy
- Mondello
