= Flemington Court House =

Former court house in Melbourne, Victoria, Australia

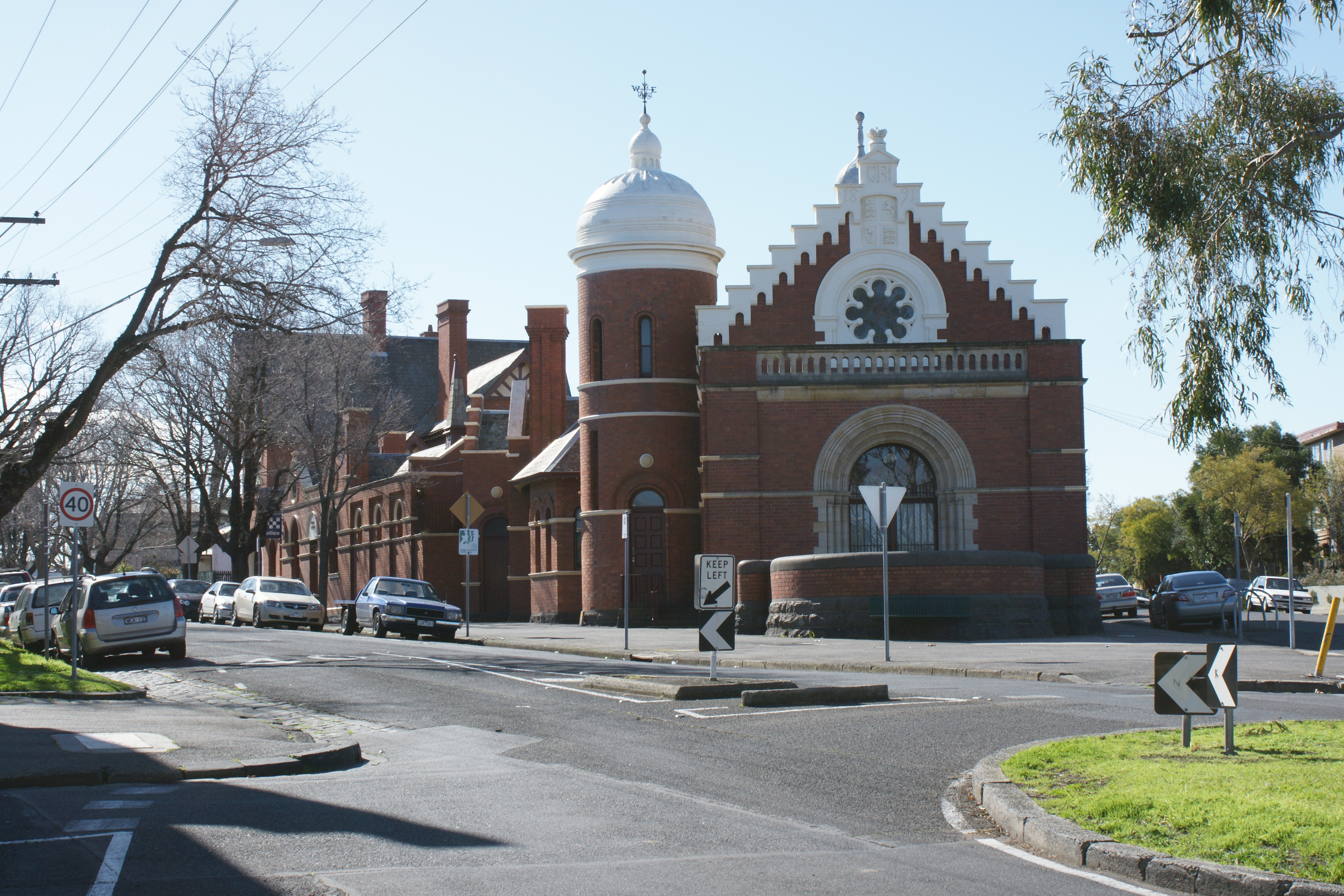
- The former court house in 2010

- Location within Melbourne

General information
- Status: Completed
- Type: Court house (1889–1982)
- Architectural style: Eclectic; Victorian Italianate; Victorian Byzantine; Lombardic Romanesque
- Location: 28 Wellington Street, Flemington, Melbourne, Victoria, Australia
- Coordinates: 37°47′08″S 144°55′55″E
- Completed: 1889; 137 years ago
- Inaugurated: 27 September 1892

Technical details
- Material: Red bricks; slate; limestone; bluestone
- Floor count: 2

Design and construction
- Architect: Alexander J. MacDonald
- Architecture firm: Public Works Department

Victorian Heritage Register
- Official name: Former Flemington Court House
- Type: Registered place
- Designated: 21 December 1988
- Reference no.: H1470
- Heritage overlay no.: HO111
- Category: Law Enforcement

The Flemington Court House is a former court house located at 28 Wellington Street, Flemington, an inner-western suburb of Melbourne, in Victoria, Australia.

Completed in 1889, (Note: Most documented history dates the completion of the building in 1889. However, some media articles issued following the official opening and the first sitting date, being 27 September 1892, state that the building was completed "… a few days ago.") the former court house was added to the Victorian Heritage Register on 21 December 1988 in recognition of its historical and architectural significance.

== History ==
Officially opened on 27 September 1892, the former court house is associated with the recording of births and deaths in the area, from the 1890s, as well as the hearing of criminal and civil law cases. Notable matters heard at the court house include the first day of the Board of Inquiry into Scientology (1963).

The building ceased functioning as a court house on 30 June 1982.

== Description ==
The former Flemington Court House, forms part of a set of buildings on a triangular site, which includes the adjacent police station and lock-up. The heritage-listed post office building on Wellington Street is within close proximity of the court house and police buildings, completed in complementary styles.

The former Flemington Court House was designed by Alexander J. MacDonald, of the Public Works Department, under the supervision of J. T. Kelleher. The building was designed in an eclectic mix of Victorian Italianate, Victorian Byzantine, and Lombardic Romanesque styles, sometimes described as an Australian interpretation of American Romanesque architecture.

Built on a bluestone base, the red-brick court house appears as a two-storey building with a round domed tower, slate roof, a recessed, arched and triple-moulded main doorway with limestone arch-corbelling up the stepped gable wall over the front entrance, and other limestone openings. The front entrance has a church-like rose or wheel window, approached via a triangular walled terrace filling the extreme corner of the site. The design is based on strong cylindrical, stepped and arched shapes, rather than relying on detailing and ornament for effect. The internal detailing of the ceiling is evident and although most of the interior fabric has been concealed or replaced, the original layout and finish of the court room space and adjoining rooms can be restored at a later date. The round domed tower has not been altered internally and the original staircase balustrade, rendered wall, and joinery are still evident.

== See also ==
- List of places on the Victorian Heritage Register in the City of Moonee Valley
