= Palazzina Cinese =

Building in Palermo, Italy

Coordinates: 38.1666°N 13.3304°E

Chinese Palace
- Palazzina Cinese
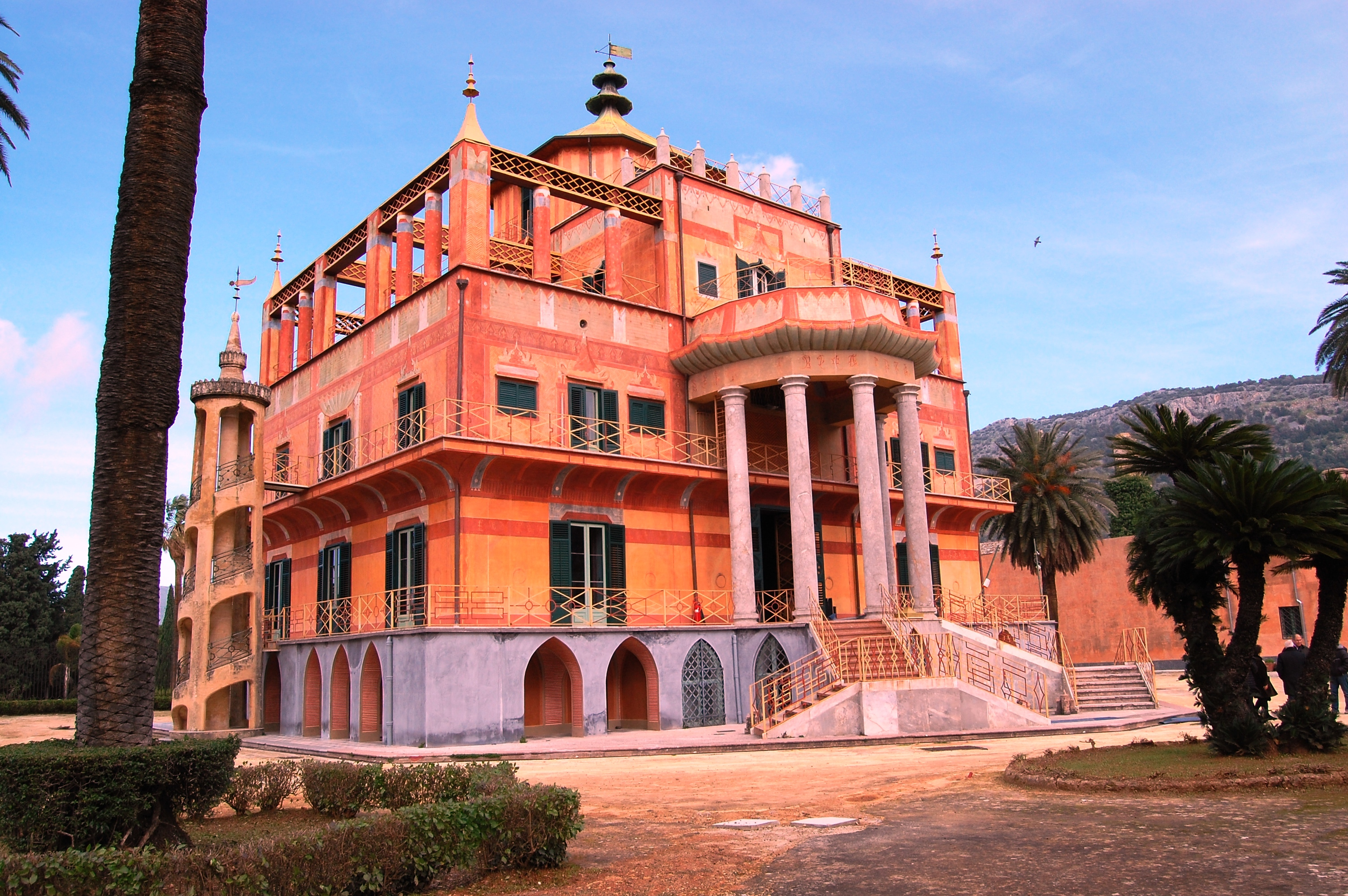
- Palazzina Cinese, façade
- Interactive map of the Chinese Palace area
- Alternative names: Real Casina alla Cinese

General information
- Status: now used as a museum
- Type: Palace
- Architectural style: Eclecticism
- Location: Palermo, Italy
- Construction started: 1799
- Completed: 1806
- Client: Ferdinand III of Bourbon

Technical details
- Floor count: 3

Design and construction
- Architect: Giuseppe Venanzio Marvuglia

The Chinese Palace (Italian: Palazzina Cinese), also known as Real Casina alla Cinese, is a former royal residence of the House of Bourbon-Two Sicilies designed in the style of Chinoiserie. It is located in Palermo, inside the park of La Favorita. The Ethnographic Museum of Sicily, named after Giuseppe Pitrè, is located in one of the Palace's guesthouses.

== History ==
The building was designed in 1799 by the architect Giuseppe Venanzio Marvuglia on commission by the King Ferdinand III of Sicily. The ruler had previously bought land and a house that was Chinese in design, belonging to the Baron Benedetto Lombardo and designed by Marvuglia himself. The architectural complex and its garden were completed between 1800 and 1806.

In 1860, as a result of the Unification of Italy, the residence passed to the House of Savoy. Then, it became the property of the Comune of Palermo and has been converted into a museum.

== Description ==
The apartments of the Palace are distributed on three floors. On the first floor, there is the entry hall, a small office, a dining room (with a "magical" table) and the King's bedroom. The second floor was dedicated to the servants and has a much lower ceiling and no frescos: male workers on one side and female workers on the other. The third floor contains the apartments of the Queen Maria Carolina of Austria. including a reception room and her private chambers. The Queen's floor is entirely surrounded by an open-air terrace giving a view of the gardens, accessible either from the interior or from two external circular staircases. The 4th and uppermost floor is an octagonal terrace covered like a pagoda.

The grand reception hall (or ballroom), bathing room, and magical table room are found semi-underground, beneath the king's living quarters.

The building is decorated with paintings and frescoes of Giuseppe Velazquez, Vincenzo Riolo, and other artists.

== Gallery ==
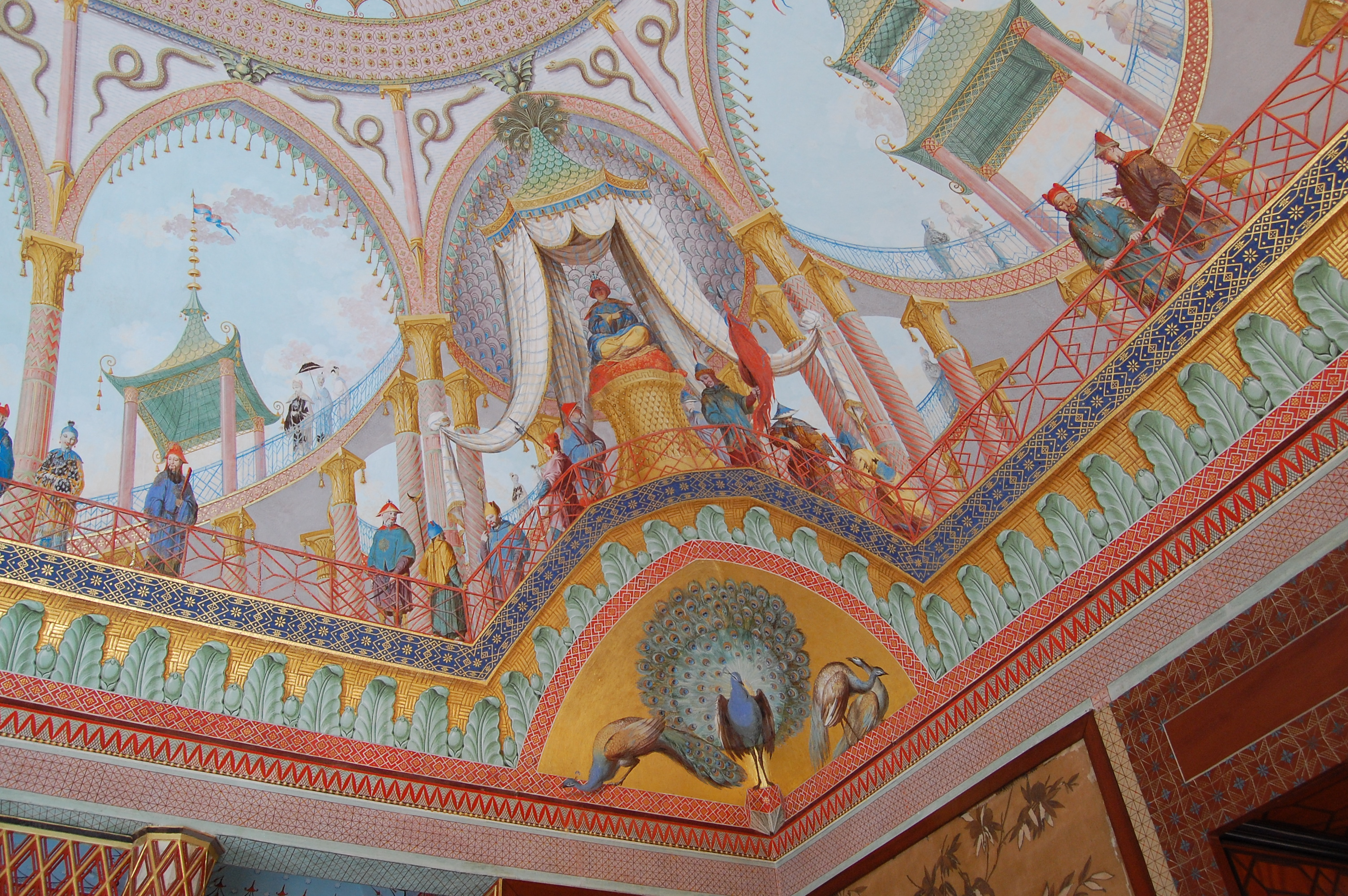
Frescoes with Chinoiserie, Giuseppe Velazquez

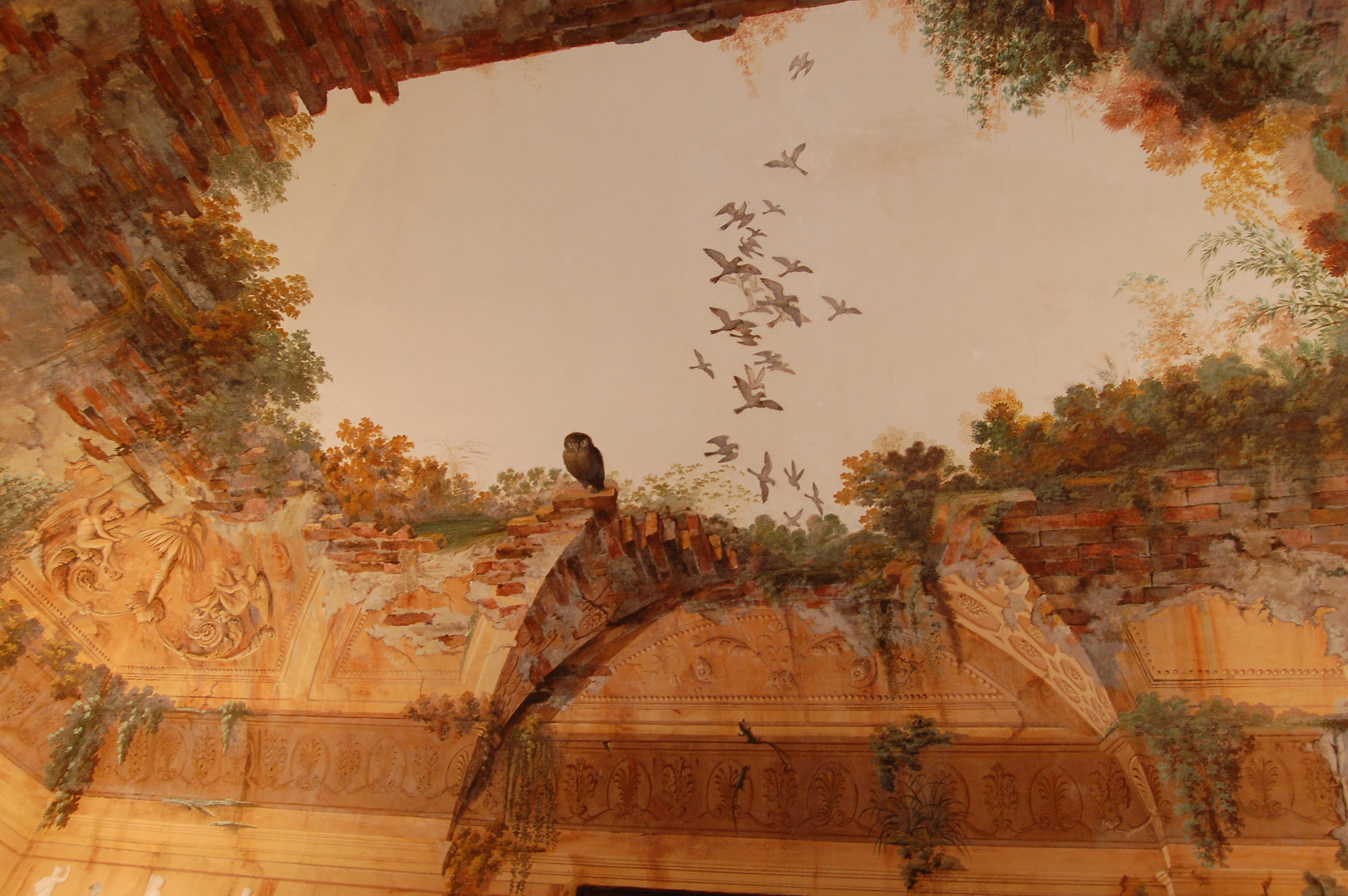
Fresco, Giuseppe Velazquez

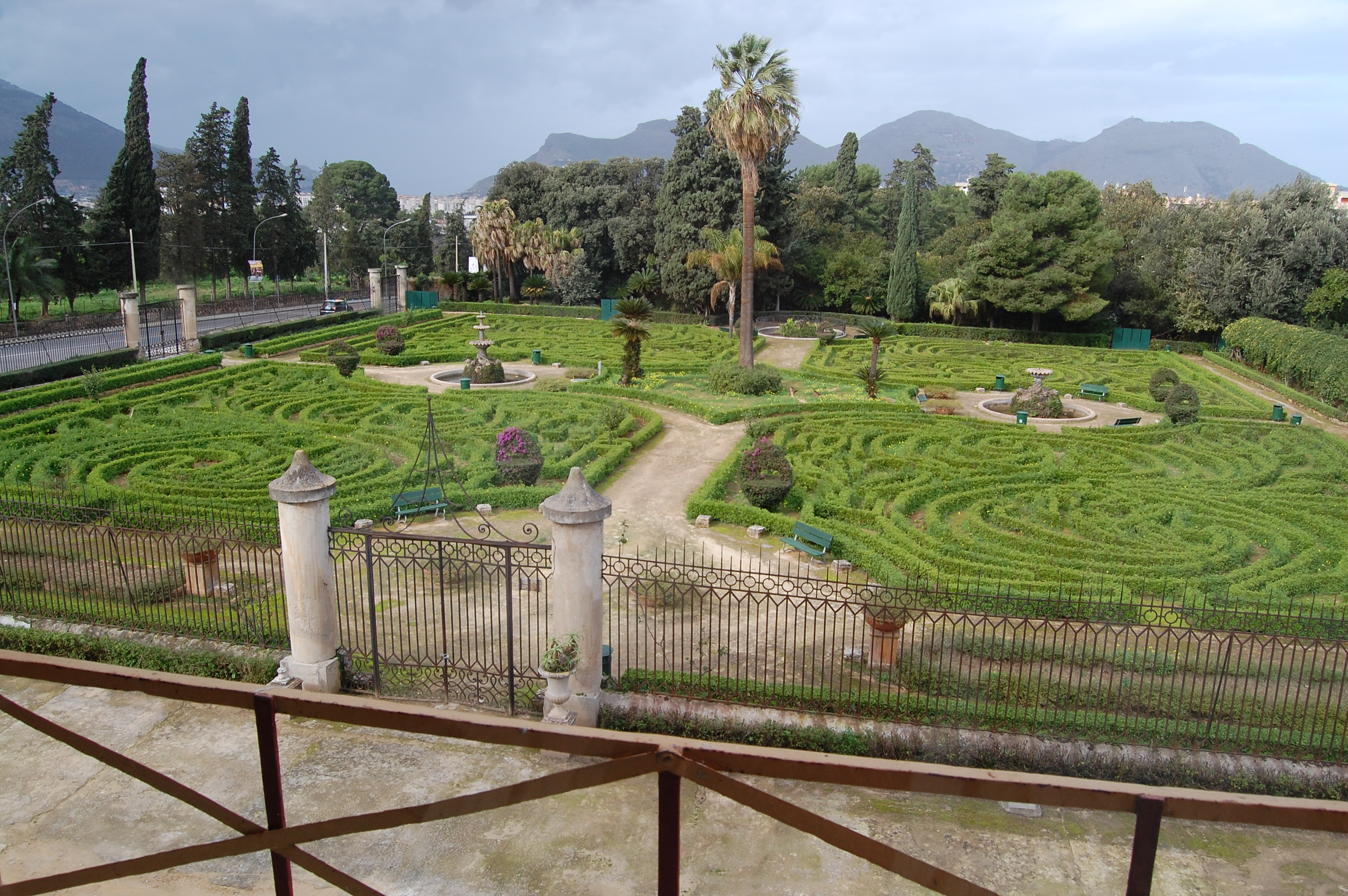
The garden

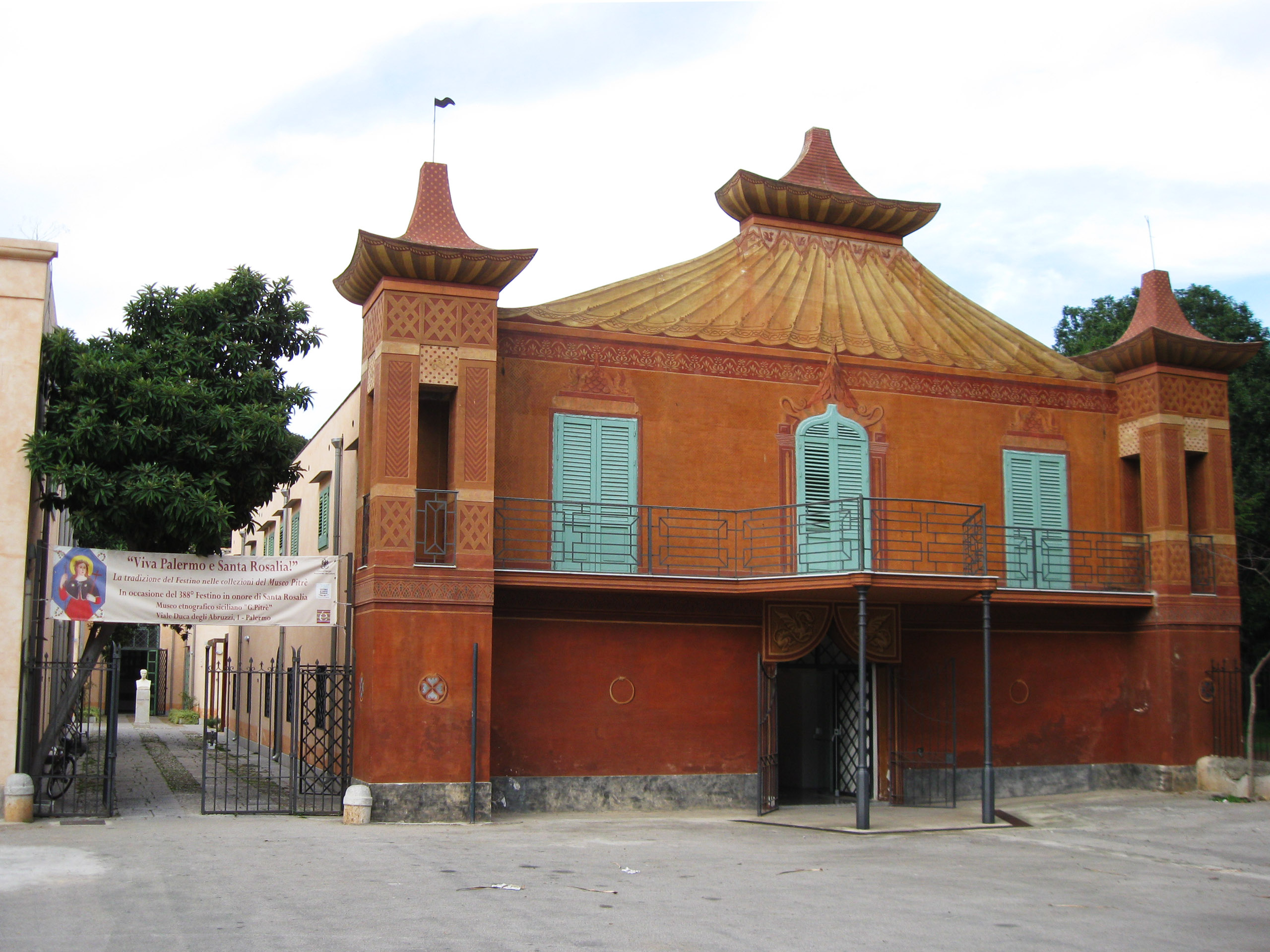
Pitrè Museum

== See also ==
- Parco della Favorita
- Riserva naturale orientata Monte Pellegrino
- Museo Etnografico Siciliano Giuseppe Pitrè
