= Flemington Post Office =

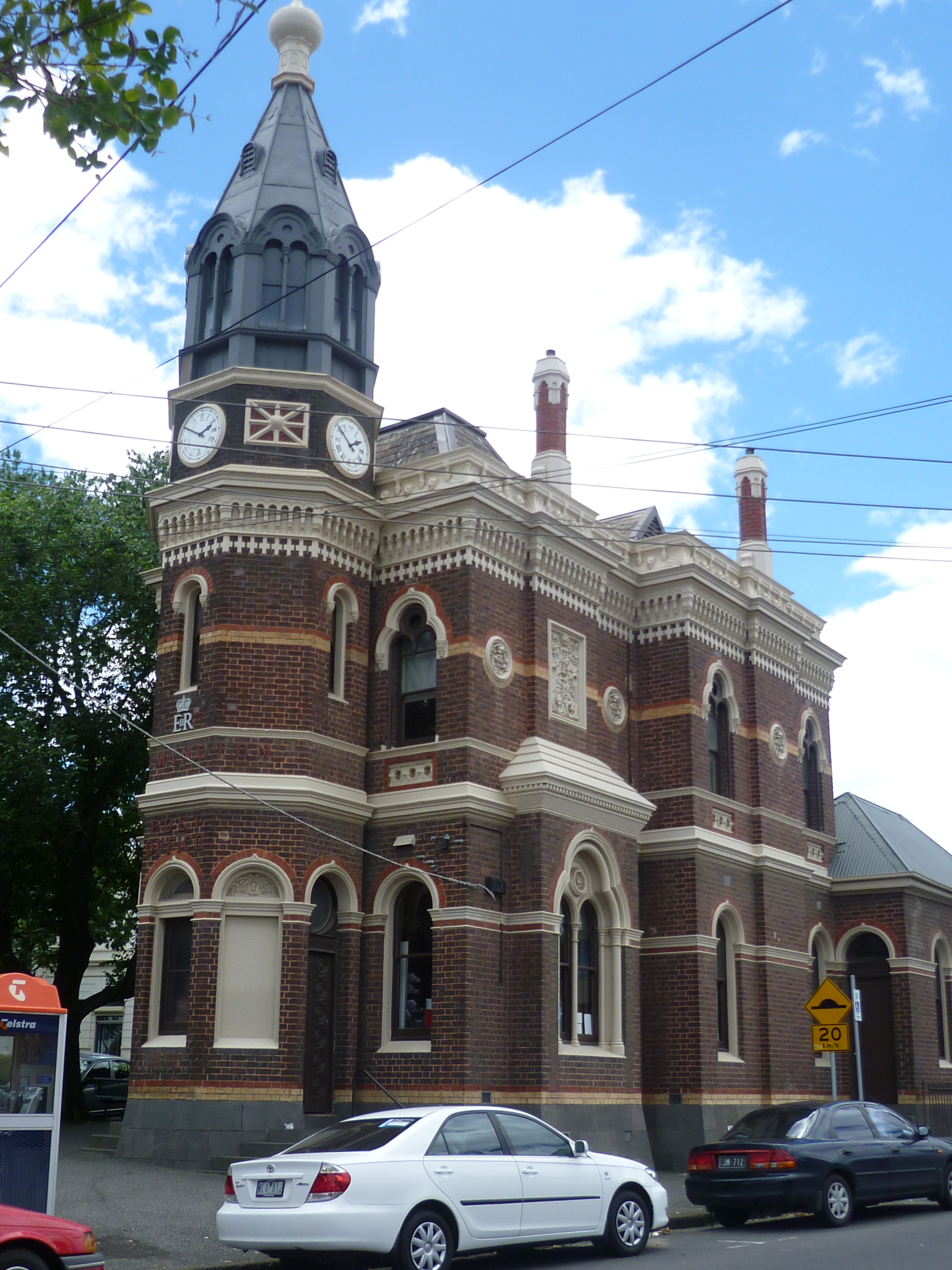
- The post office in 2010

- Location of the post office in Greater Metropolitan Melbourne
- Interactive map of Flemington Post Office
- 37°47′14″S 144°55′54″E
- Type: Post office
- Location: 2A Wellington Street, Flemington, Victoria, Australia

History
- Built: 1889–1890
- Built by: B. Pratt (Note: Also listed in some sources as P. Pratt.)
- Built for: Victorian Colonial Government
- Original use: Post office (ground floor); Residence (first floor)

Site notes
- Material: Bricks; stucco; slate; galvanised iron
- Architects: John Russell Brown; (Department of Public Works); A. J. MacDonald (tower)
- Architectural style: Eclecticism
- Owner: Australia Post
- Public access: Yes

Commonwealth Heritage List
- Official name: Flemington Post Office
- Type: Listed place (Historic)
- Designated: 8 November 2011
- Reference no.: 105517

Victorian Heritage Register
- Official name: Flemington Post Office
- Type: Registered place
- Designated: 19 September 1996
- Reference no.: H1201
- Heritage overlay no.: HO121
- Category: Postal and Telecommunications

Register of the National Estate
- Official name: Flemington Post Office
- Type: Defunct list
- Designated: 21 March 1978
- Reference no.: 5230

The Flemington Post Office is a post office located at 2A Wellington Street, Flemington, an inner western suburb of Melbourne, in Victoria, Australia. Completed in 1890 in an eclectic style, designed by John Russell Brown, the building remains in use as a post office.

The post office was added to the Australian Commonwealth Heritage List on 8 November 2011; and to the Victorian Heritage Register on 19 September 1996 in recognition of its architectural importance. The post office was also added to a non-statutory list by the Victorian branch of the National Trust on 2 September 1971, and to the now defunct Register of the National Estate on 21 March 1978.

In 2005, comedian Barry Humphries stated that his favourite building in Melbourne was the Flemington Post Office.

== History ==
Flemington's first official post office was established during the 1880s, replacing the various "non-official" post offices that had operated in the area since the 1850s.

The building was designed in 1888 by John Russell Brown, an architect from the Department of Public Works, under the supervision of John Thomas Kelleher. The tower was detailed by Alexander James Macdonald, and the builder was P. Pratt. The post office was moved from its original site south of Buckland Street, Flemington, to Wellington Street in 1890 so that it was close to the developing commercial centre along Racecourse Road.

Timber public telephone booths and a cast iron pillar box were installed on the footpath opposite the main entrance c. 1920s. The domed side porch roof was replaced at an unknown date between 1917 and 1963 with a parapeted flat roof which involved creation of semi-circular arched openings in lieu of original three-pointed arch and Moorish detail. The cast iron gates were removed from the porch as part of the work. A stamp vending machine and postal slips were installed in the northern wall of the porch. By 1963, all external stucco and bluestone detail including the tower roof had been overpainted in white; signage and insignia had been added to main tower; the windows in tower ground floor had been overpainted and the original clock faces replaced.

General alterations were made at an unknown date to internal fittings and services included overpainting of polished timber joinery, installation of a sliding timber door between the original mail and letter carriers' rooms, replacement of lights, installation of heating and fans. The skirting boards were also replaced in the former dining room (later parcel room) and vinyl flooring and carpet laid throughout. Around this time, the rear of the original counter was altered to accommodate modern equipment. The rear single-storey wing had been re-roofed with corrugated galvanised steel roofing by 1975.

In 1989–90, extensive rear additions were constructed to provide a mail room, bicycle/scooter shed, cleaner's store, post office box lobby, covered loading bay and plant enclosure. This involved demolition of the original rear veranda and pantry and subdivision of the original ground floor pantry to provide a passage to the new building. The southern half of the original dining room east wall was demolished to facilitate access to the passage. Alterations at first floor level included construction of a small kitchenette in the former sitting room and installation of staff amenities in the western half of the plan. A galvanised steel tube handrail installed at the main entrance doors and concrete topping was poured over main bluestone step. General internal refurbishment of finishes was also carried out.

== Description ==
The two-storey brick structure with stucco mouldings is dominated by an octagonal tower with conical roof, onion dome, clock tower, and crescent moon finial. The building utilises an acute-angled intersection between Wellington and Shields Street and 50 metres (160 ft) from the Racecourse Road shopping centre, is complemented by William Wolf's Kennedy Terrace of 1888, a wedge-shaped housing development, in addition to the Public Works Department's own Court House and Police Station, completed several years after the Post Office. Brickwork of the building is tuckpointed and polychromatic with brown body bricks, red, white and black string courses and red dressings to openings. Cornices, parapets and windows are enriched with deeply moulded stucco work and the facetted corner tower has a facetted conical sheet metal clad roof surmounted by an onion-domed sphere and finial recalling Moorish architecture. Similar references occur in the corbel table to the main cornice and the cusped window heads.

The complex roofscape is variously composed of mansard and jerkinhead forms and clad with slate, however original cast iron cresting has been removed. The single-storey rear section is hipped and finished with recent corrugated galvanised steel.

The rear service yard occupies the broad northern portion of the triangular site and crossovers from Wellington and Shields streets provide vehicular through access. A steel-framed canopy shelters the rear loading dock directly into the non-original mail room wing which has an integral bicycle shed. The Wellington Street frontage is partly screened by an original cast iron and bluestone palisade fence, while the remaining boundary is defined by a more recent corrugated steel fence and steel gates. Elsewhere, the building is essentially constructed to the property boundary.

Fenestration is regular between the long elevations and between floors, however openings are variously defined by alternative arch and tracery types according to hierarchy and each contains a timber-framed double-hung sash window. Entrances contain panelled timber doors and the former private entrance is surrounded by matching panelled side and highlights finished with etched ruby glass. The side panels have been infilled with timber boarding.

=== Condition and integrity ===
The slate roof and tower require very careful restoration. The cast iron palisading and finials on the roof have been removed. Externally, Flemington Post Office's ability to demonstrate its original design is very good with regard to the architectural conception, principal materials and detail despite rear additions constructed in 1989 and replacement of the private porch roof. The rear addition is a low-key design, and it attempts to not compete with the original from a distance; however, closer inspection indicates subtle difference in detail. The exterior appears generally well maintained, and conservation works in the late 1980s have generally restored the building's aesthetic and stylistic attributes.

Internally, the 1989 additions have partially diminished the legibility of the original planning and program towards the rear of the complex; however, elsewhere, it is generally very good. More superficial refurbishment such as overpainting of joinery and installation of floor coverings and the like is largely reversible. The main entrance, public space and former mail room, for example, are all largely intact in form and fabric with added features such as the original curved counter and arcaded screen intact.

It is apparent that the building overall is generally well maintained; however, there is evidence in a number of instances of rising and falling damp which is starting to damage the adjoining fabric. Repairs are required to some sections of pointing mortar in the bluestone plinth and brickwork, and tuckpointing needs repointing. Wall cracking is evident in the southeast corner of the postmaster's office, but the ceiling has been repaired.

== Heritage listings ==
=== Commonwealth Heritage List ===
Historically, Flemington Post Office of 1889 was the first in a series of major public buildings, including the Court House and Police Station and Lock-up, sited in the post-gold growth centre of Flemington. Built to replace an earlier post office operating from at least 1869, the building was sited to one side of an old gold rush trekking route. The importance of Flemington Post Office has also been recognised in a national postage stamp series of Australia's leading post offices. The post office is noted for retaining its original timber counter with cast iron colonnettes supporting arched openings, and original timber writing desks with leather inlaid writing surfaces, fitted to alcoves in the public space.

Flemington Post Office is an exceptional example of a large suburban post office with quarters. The composition is skilfully conceived taking full advantage of the awkward site to dictate the program arrangement. Its stylistic eclecticism is an extraordinary example associated with the period of public works department "Battle of the Styles". Its hybrid Victorian-Federation style is tied together by unexpected embellishment using Moorish motifs. Architecturally, Flemington is an excellent solution to an awkward site, considered to be one of the most skilful compositions by the Public Works Department architects at the time. The eastern division of the PWD, in which these architects practised, was considered the most inventive of all of the architectural sections of the department.

Flemington Post Office also has dramatic landmark qualities deriving from its prominent position on an acute-angled site, dual approach, visibility in the round, and a five-level tower. The building is a distinguishing feature of the surrounding Flemington Hill Conservation Area, which is typified by a highly intact Victorian character. The highly artistic and skilful handling of an awkward triangular site demonstrates great merit and unity of conception despite the hand of three separate designers. Flemington Post office has social significance within this inner region of Melbourne, not just for its continuity of providing postal services from the site for almost 120 years, but also due to its much valued form and architectural treatment. Flemington Post Office is additionally associated with three enduring and capable architects engaged by the Public Works Department during the late nineteenth century, Kelleher, McDonald and Brown. The eastern district of the architectural section of the department was considered to be the most inventive and produced many notable and award-winning buildings with remarkable features, of which Flemington is one of the most distinguished.

=== Victorian Heritage Register ===
The Flemington Post Office is important as an extraordinary example of the stylistic eclecticism associated with the period of public works architecture known as the "Battle of the Styles".

== See also ==
- Architecture of Melbourne
- List of places on the Commonwealth Heritage List in Victoria
- List of places on the Victorian Heritage Register in the City of Moonee Valley
