= Sicilian Ethnographic Museum Giuseppe Pitrè =

Coordinates: 38°10′00.6″N 13°19′49.35″E

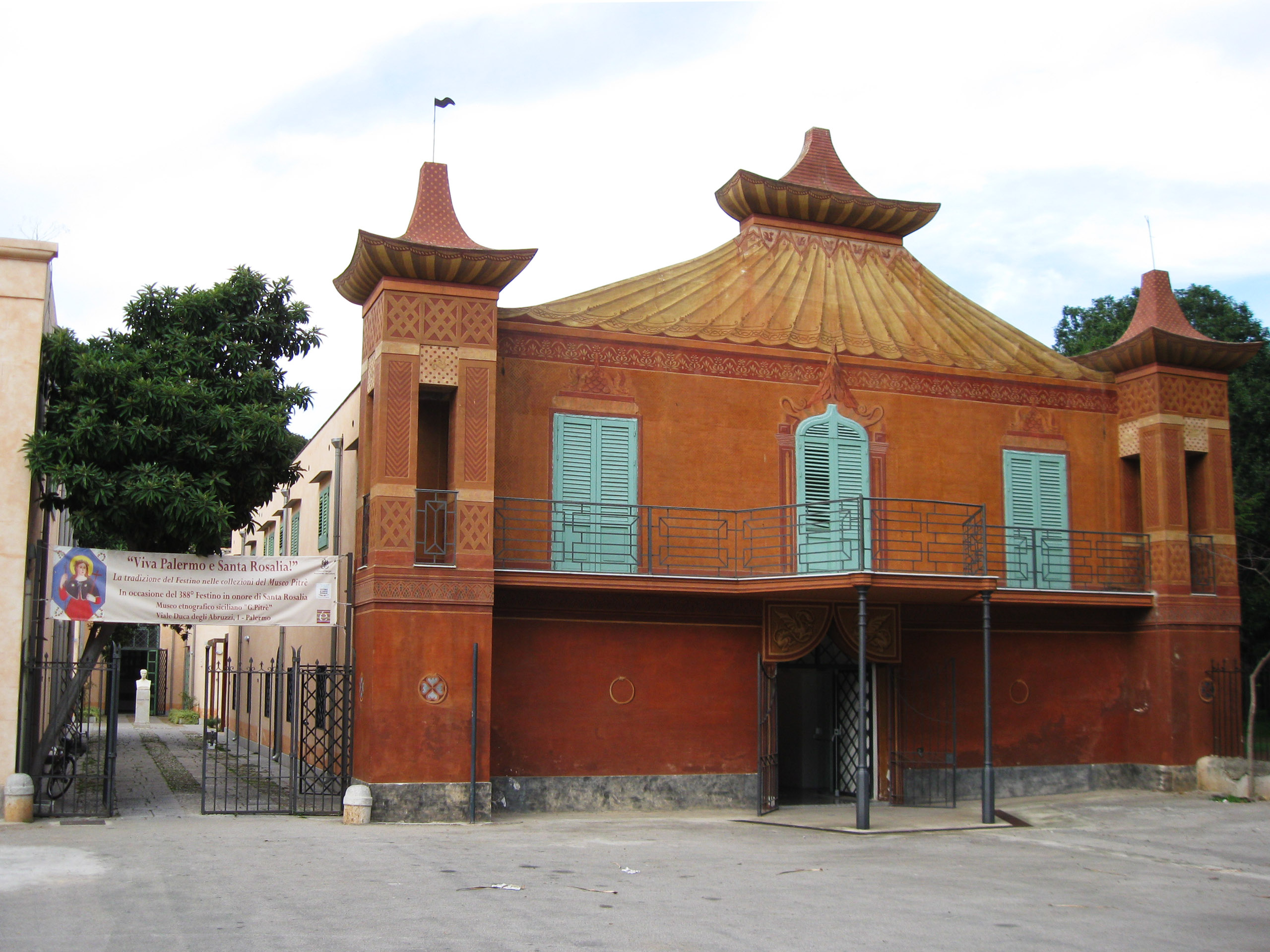
- Entrance of the museum, La Favorita Park
- Established: 1909
- Location: Viale Duca degli Abruzzi, 1 Via delle Pergole, 74; Palermo, Sicily, Italy
- Type: Ethnographic museum
- Collections: Culture, local, artistry, library

The Sicilian Ethnographic Museum Giuseppe Pitrè (Italian: Museo Etnografico Siciliano Giuseppe Pitrè) is a museum in Palermo, Italy.

The museum has two locations: the main part is located in one of the Palazzina Cinese's guesthouse, inside La Favorita Park, and another is in the Albergaria quarter, within the historic centre of Palermo.

The museum was founded by the scholar Giuseppe Pitrè in 1909 and is named after him. It houses a rich library containing more than 30,000 volumes and provides many types of documentation about Sicilian culture, traditions and folklore.

== Costumes ==
The costume section opens with men's clothes. The most primitive is that of shepherds consisting of a jacket and breeches (vrachi) formed with goat skins. Animal skin also the pocket, carried crossbody, where wine and food were placed, and the typical footwear, the pilu scarpi. Various models of festive costume, of which the breeches (càusi), the waistcoat ('u cileccu), the jacket, the cap (birritta) or a turban (turbanti) are some of the typical elements. The museum has different types of hats, related to street life and fields, such as curina cappeddu, worked with straw filaments. Shirts and underpants are part of a newer kit. With fine linen, the shirt is wide and wide, while the underpants are always long and white. The base of heavier garments, including the scappularu, a long cloak with a hood, was orbace, a heavy woolen fabric, which in Sicily was almost always colored in black. Of orbace for example is the typical costume of the peasants of Modica.

On display in the museum are disparate simple women's costumes for fabrics and cutting, sumptuous for brocades and sewers. Those of the peasants were usually composed of a cotton bust (dispersals), the petti coat (baschina) and an apron (falaro).
