= Antico Stabilimento Balneare of Mondello =

Seaside resort in Mondello, Palermo, Italy

Coordinates: 38.2026°N 13.3271°E

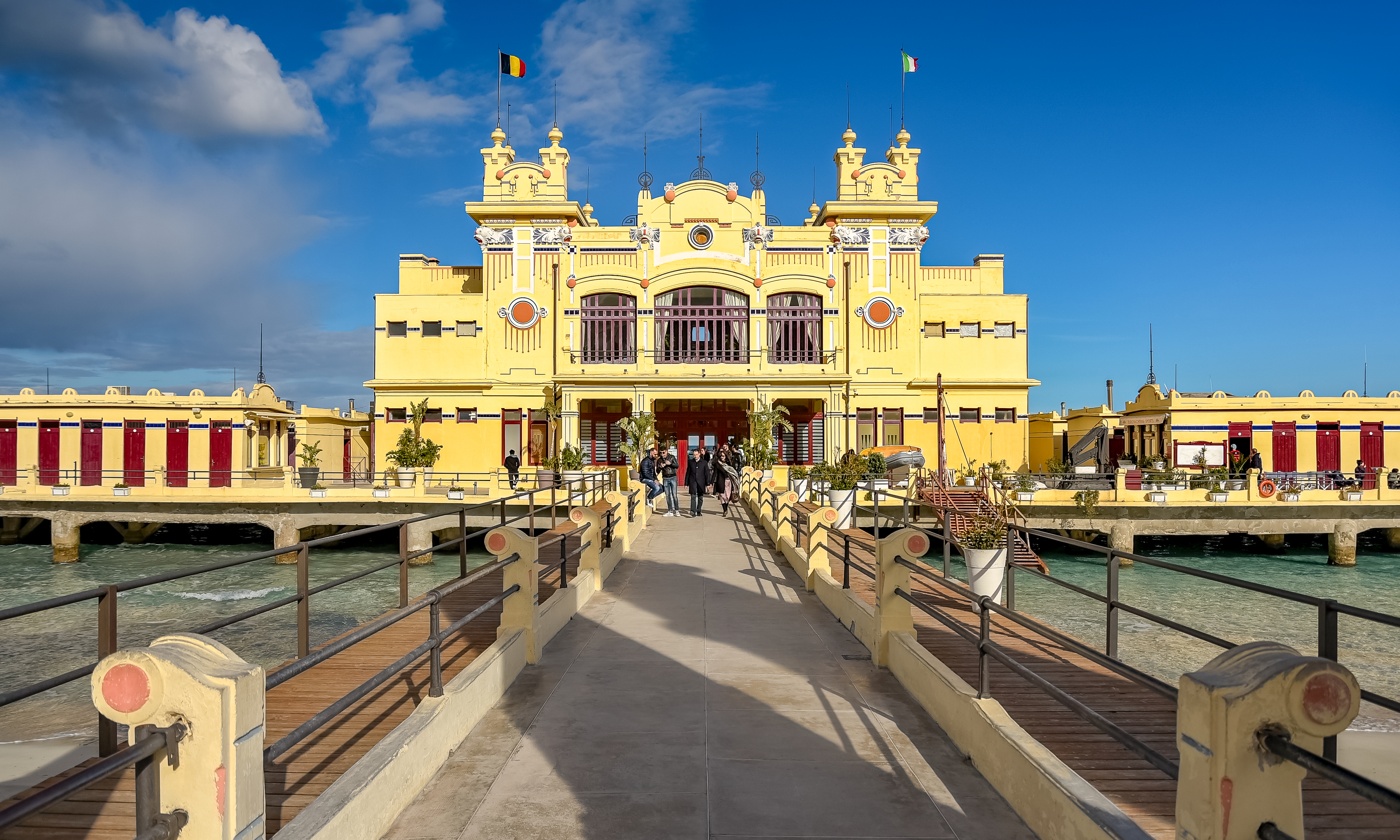
View from pier entrance

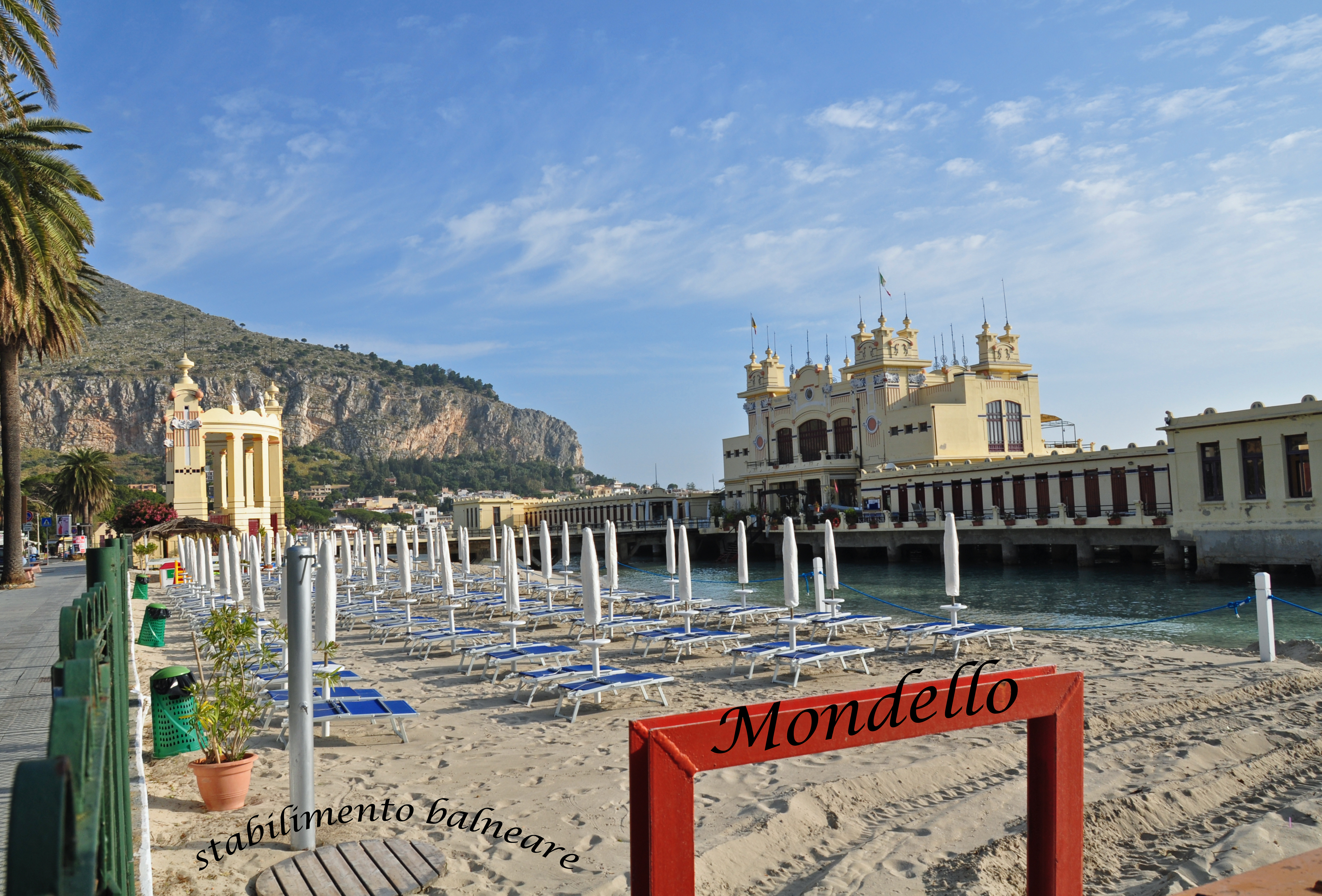
Wide view of establishment

The Antico Stabilimento Balneare (Ancient Bathing Establishment) located in Mondello, a seaside borough north of Palermo, Sicily, is an Art Nouveau or Liberty-style building atop piers of the beach in the town. The term balneare is related to the Spanish and Portuguese Balneario which is either a swimming or beach establishment, but also with affinities to spas, with amenities such as changing rooms, cabanas, bathrooms, and eating establishments.

The design of the present structure with colorful and fanciful decorations with turrets and spires was traditionally credited to Rudolf Stualker, a supposed Belgian or Austrian architect or engineer about whom nothing is known. A recent research has clarified that Rudolf Stualker results from the misspelling of the name of Rodolfo Stoelcker who was a German-Italian structural engineer that designed the foundations of the Stabilimento while the identity of its architectural designer remains unknown. The building stands upon cement pylons embedded in the bay and were among the earliest reinforced concrete artifacts to be made in Palermo. Tradition has it that this structure was originally intended for the Belgian city of Ostend. The beachfront area of Mondello until the end of the 19th century was a malaria-afflicted swamp, with a seashore used by fishermen. Drained during the last decade of 1890, much of the area was leased to a Belgian company, Les Tramways de Palerme, who not only established a trolley connecting this suburb to Palermo, but electrified the area, which became populated with pleasure villas. This company financed construction of the structure, built with reinforced concrete, and it was inaugurated in 1912. Construction was performed by the firm of Salvatore Rutelli, a relative of the sculptor Mario Rutelli, the foundations were built by the Ferrobeton company. The interior furniture was designed by the firm of Vittorio Ducrot and Ernesto Basile. The establishment was highly popular during its first three decades.

But during the Second World War, the facility was occupied first by the Italian, then the German, then the Allied army, and much of the furniture was extracted. Since the 1990s a refurbishment has aimed to restore much of the structure and decorations. The site now houses a restaurant and hosts beachside activities.
