= Parco della Favorita =

Park in Palermo, Italy

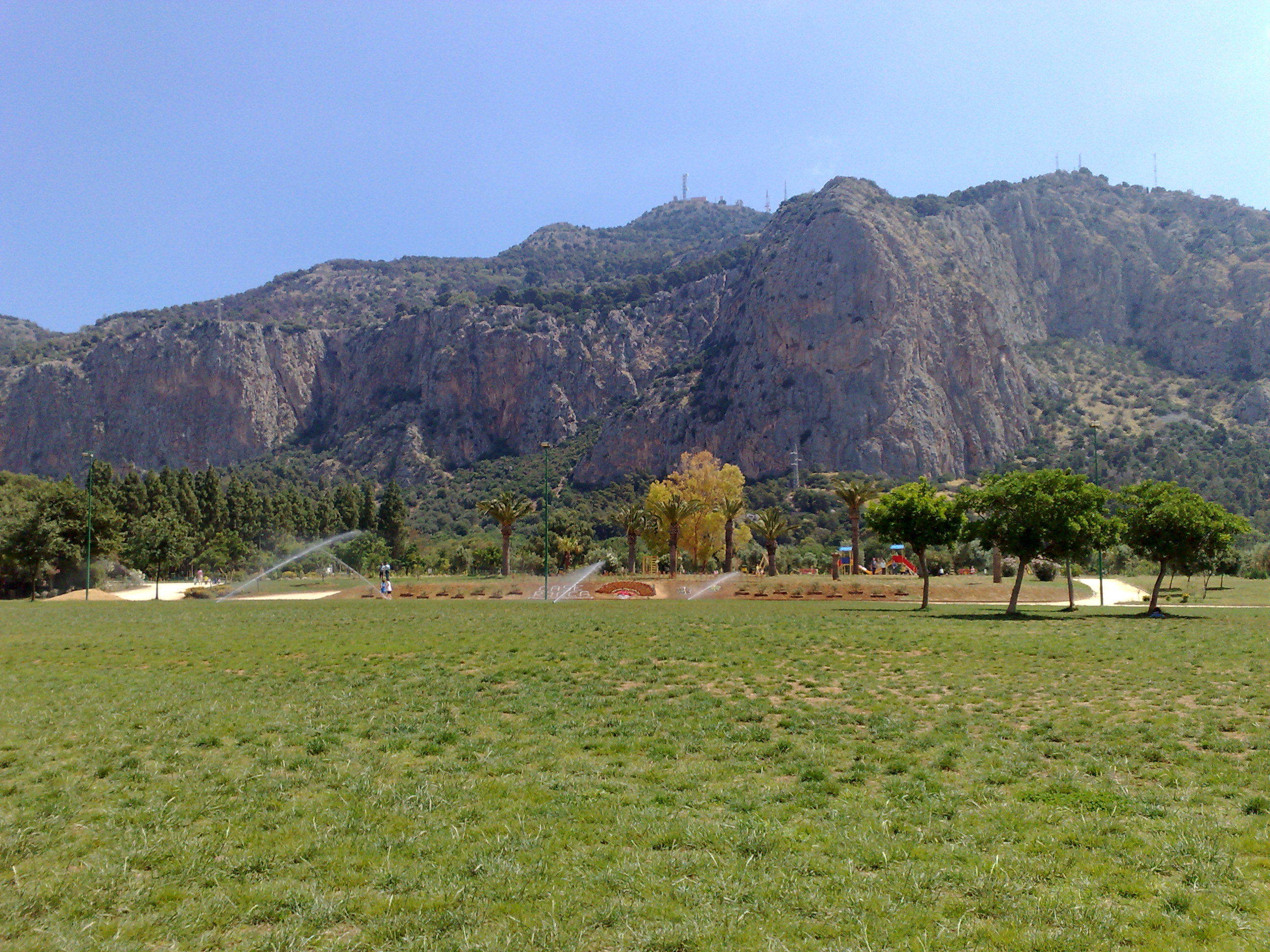
- The Park and Monte Pellegrino
- Interactive map of Parco della Favorita
- Type: Natural Area
- Location: Palermo, Sicily, Italy
- Coordinates: 38°09′44″N 13°20′16″E
- Area: 400 hectares (990 acres)
- Created: 1799
- Operator: Riserva naturale orientata Monte Pellegrino

La Favorita Park (Italian: Parco della Favorita or Real Tenuta della Favorita) is a large city park in Palermo, Italy. Established in 1799 by Ferdinand III of Sicily, it has an overall area of 400 hectares (990 acres), and represent the biggest green area of Palermo. It is located at the foot of Monte Pellegrino, in the north-western part of the city.

== History ==
The park was founded by the King Ferdinand III after his escape from Naples in 1798. In order to create the park, many properties were forfeited by the House of Bourbon-Two Sicilies. The park was used for several purposes: it represented a fresh oasis during the summer, but also a game preserve and a space for agricultural experiments with big cultivations of citrus fruits, olive trees, ashes, nuts and sumac.

The park is part of the Riserva naturale orientata Monte Pellegrino, established by the Sicilian Region in 1995.

== Description ==
The park extends from the shade of Monte Pellegrino to the neighbourhood of Pallavicino. Two long streets (named after Hercules and Diana) cross in parallel the park, connecting the centre of Palermo to the seaside borough of Mondello. The streets are interwoven thanks to a third avenue named after Pomona.

Within (or near) the park are located several places of interest like the royal residence called Palazzina Cinese (with the attached Museo Etnografico Siciliano Giuseppe Pitrè), the precious Villa Niscemi, the Neoclassical Fountain of Hercules, the Renzo Barbera Stadium and other sport facilities.
