= Giuseppe Pitrè =

Italian ethnologist (1841–1916)

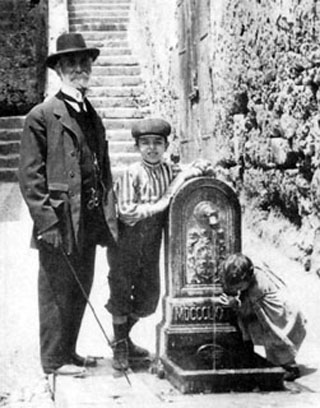

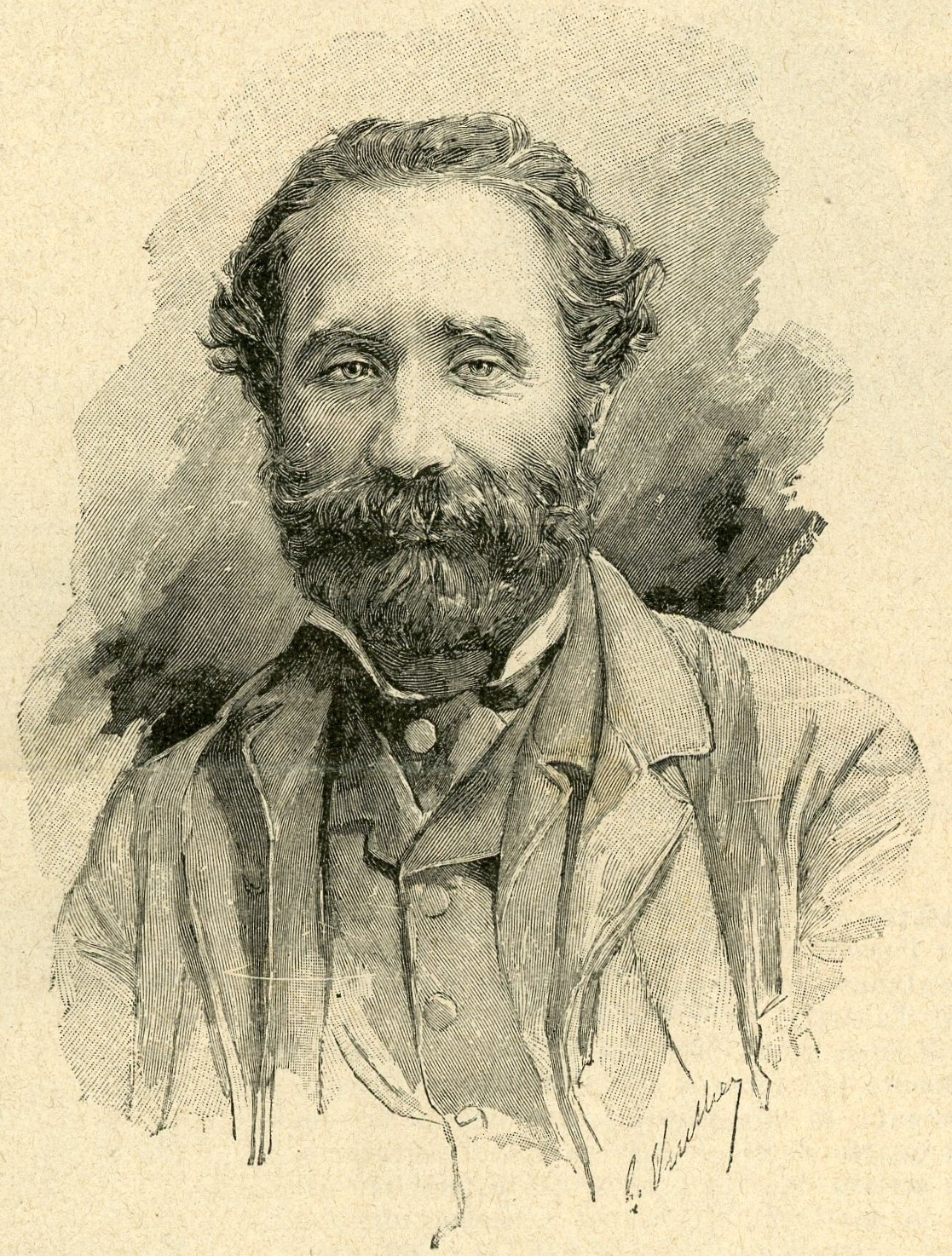
Pitrè in 1898

Giuseppe Pitrè (Note: Most sources, including Enciclopedia Treccani, register the spelling Pitrè, with grave accent, implying that the final stressed vowel is pronounced open [ɛ]. A few others, such as DOP (Dizionario d'ortografia e di pronunzia) and Sapere encyclopedia, prefer Pitré, indicating close-mid [e]. During the 19th century almost only the grave accent was in use, and the genuine Sicilian pronunciation is [pɪˈʈɽɛ].) (22 December 1841 – 10 April 1916) was an Italian folklorist, medical doctor, professor, and senator for Sicily. As a folklorist he is credited with extending the concept of folklore to include all manifestations of popular life. He is also considered a forerunner in the field of medical history.

Pitrè was born in Palermo. After serving as a volunteer in 1860 under Garibaldi, and graduating in medicine in 1866, he threw himself into the study of literature, and wrote the first scientific studies on Italian popular culture, pioneering Italian ethnographic studies. He founded the study of "folk psychology", in Sicily, teaching at the University of Palermo.

Between 1871 and 1913, he compiled the Biblioteca delle tradizioni popolari siciliane ("Library of Sicilian popular traditions"), a collection of Sicilian oral culture in twenty-five volumes.

Pitrè's Fiabe, novelle e racconti popolari siciliani ("Sicilian Fairy Tales, Stories, and Folktales"), 1875, documenting Sicily's rich folkloric heritage derived from both European and Middle Eastern traditions, is the culmination of the great European folklore scholarship that began earlier in the 19th century. Against the cultural grain of his times, Pitrè championed the common people of Sicily and their customs, and his scholarship of oral narrative tradition is arguably as significant as that of the Brothers Grimm.

In 1880 Pitrè co-founded the folk traditions journal Archivio per lo studio delle tradizioni popolari (English: Archive for the Study of Popular Traditions), which he edited until 1906, and in 1894 he published a basic bibliography of Italian popular traditions. He was made an honorary member of the American Folklore Society in 1890. Palermo's Museo Antropologico Etnografico Siciliano was founded in his memory.
