= Eclecticism in art =

Art style combining multiple styles in a work

Eclecticism is a kind of mixed style in the fine arts: "the borrowing of a variety of styles from different sources and combining them" (Hume 1998, 5). Significantly, Eclecticism hardly ever constituted a specific style in art: it is characterized by the fact that it was not a particular style. In general, the term describes the combination in a single work of a variety of influences—mainly of elements from different historical styles in architecture, painting, and the graphic and decorative arts. In music the term used may be either eclecticism or polystylism.

== In the visual arts ==
The term eclectic was first used by Johann Joachim Winckelmann to characterize the art of the Carracci, who incorporated in their paintings elements from the Renaissance and classical traditions. Indeed, Agostino, Annibale and Lodovico Carracci had tried to combine in their art Michelangelo's line, Titian's color, Correggio's chiaroscuro, and Raphael's symmetry and grace.

In the 18th century, Sir Joshua Reynolds, head of the Royal Academy of Arts in London, was one of the most influential advocates of eclecticism. In the sixth of his famous academical Discourses (1774), he wrote that the painter may use the work of the ancients as a "magazine of common property, always open to the public, whence every man has a right to take what materials he pleases" (Reynolds 1775, 26).

== Western architecture ==
Early examples of eclectic architecture were built in the Kingdom of the Two Sicilies, particularly in the Palazzina Cinese in Palermo..

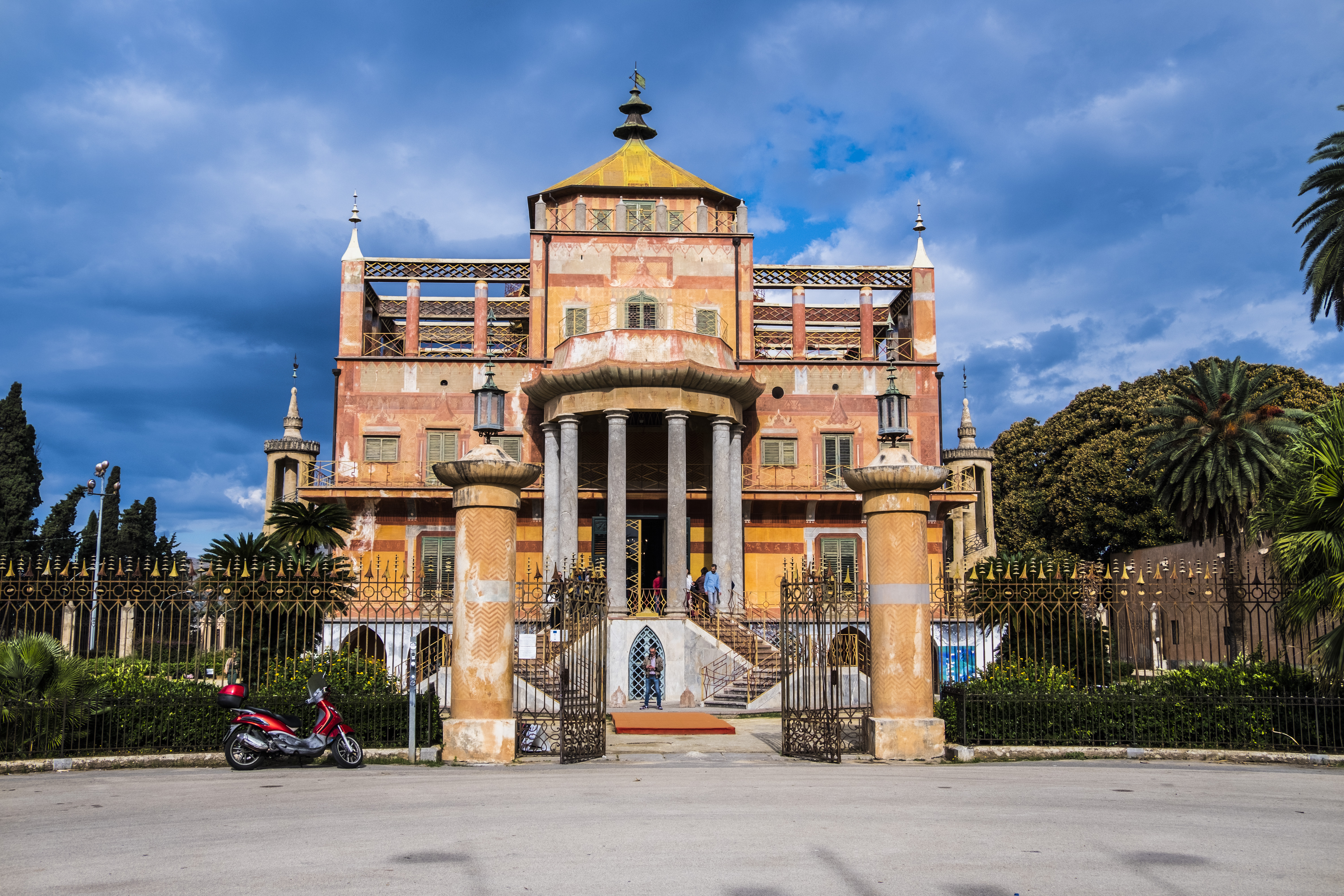
Palazzina Cinese in Palermo

Eclecticism "was an important concept in Western architecture during the mid- and late 19th century, and it reappeared in a new guise in the latter part of the 20th century" (Muthesius n.d.).

== Sources ==
- Hume, Helen D. (1998), The Art Teacher's Book of Lists, San Francisco: Jossey-Bass, ISBN 0-7879-7424-2
- Muthesius, Stefan. (n.d.) "Eclecticism". Grove Art Online. Oxford Art Online. (subscription access) (accessed 19 September 2008)
- Reynolds, Joshua (1775), A Discourse, Delivered to the Students of the Royal Academy, on the Distribution of the Prizes, Dec. the 10th, 1774, London: T. Davies
