= Mondello =

District of Palermo, Sicily, Italy

Mondello Munneḍḍu (Sicilian)
- Frazione
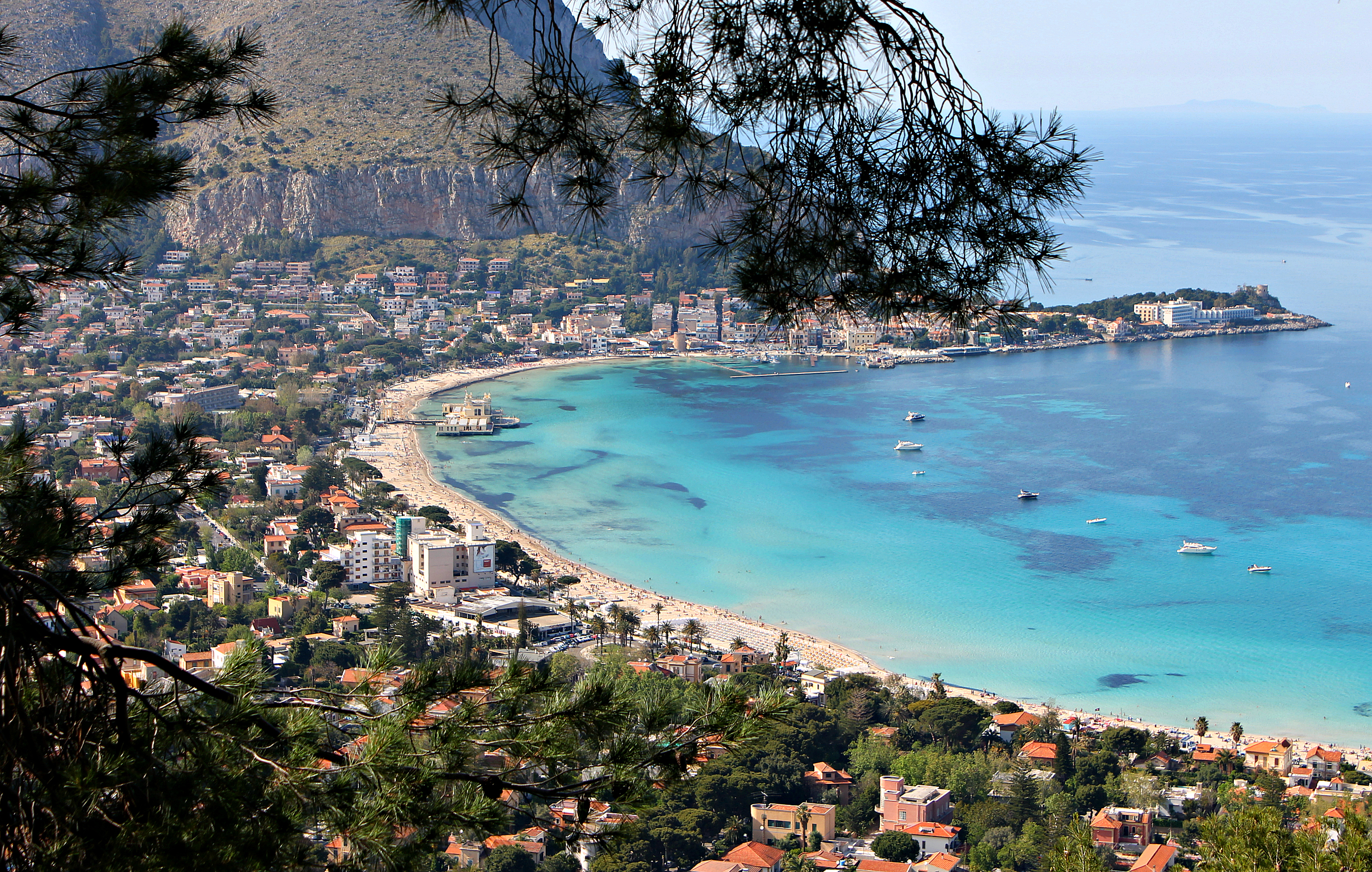
- View of Mondello from Mount Pellegrino

- Location of Mondello in Italy
- Coordinates: 38°12′03″N 13°19′23″E
- Country: Italy
- Region: Sicily
- Province: Metropolitan City of Palermo
- Comune: Palermo
- Elevation: 5 m (16 ft)

Population (2013)
  - Total: 12,150
- Time zone: UTC+1 (CET)
  - Summer (DST): UTC+2 (CEST)
- Postal code: 90151
- Dialing code: 091

Mondello (Sicilian: Munneḍḍu) is a seaside district of the city of Palermo in the autonomous region of Sicily, in Southern Italy.

It lies on a sandy bay delimited by two hills called Mount Gallo and Mount Pellegrino, in the northernmost area of the city. In the administrative subdivision, it falls within the 7th municipal division (or circoscrizione) of Palermo and it is annexed to the surrounding neighborhoods of Addaura and Partanna, with which it forms the 22nd major neighborhood (or quartiere) of the city, Partanna-Mondello.

Archaeological evidence of settlement in the area dates back to the Upper Paleolithic. During the ancient history, Mondello Bay became a passage point for sailors from different cultures, such as the Western Phoenicians, the ancient Greeks and the Romans. The small port in the main square of the current district was founded around the 5th century BC, when the bay was part of the Phoenician trade network.

During the Roman Republic, intense deforestation activities on Mount Pellegrino altered the normal flow of water in the south-eastern section of the bay. This caused the birth of a swamp in the area at the base of the mountain, known as Valdesi, which characterized the landscape until the 19th century.

In medieval times a small village arose on the northern edge of the bay. The community prospered economically due to the abundant profits from fishing and agriculture. In the 15th century a tuna fishery was built, which quickly became the most successful business in the village. In that period the military defense of the place became necessary due to the frequent attacks by Barbary corsairs.

In the late 18th century, part of the area was annexed to La Favorita Royal Estate, the private estate of King Ferdinand I of the Two Sicilies. Today, the site—which is the largest urban park in Palermo—divides the district of Mondello from the city centre, and the roads built inside it represent the main connection between the two areas.

In the early 20th century, Mondello became a luxury seaside resort for the aristocracy and the bourgeoisie. In 1911, the Municipality of Palermo reached an agreement with an Italian-Belgian company for the construction of a new district in the area aimed to the wealthier social classes. The new neighborhood was planned according to the canons of the garden city movement and its construction involved the leading architects of the Palermo modernist school, such as Ernesto Basile and his students. A number of Liberty style villas on the seafront promenade have made it one of the gems of Art Nouveau in Europe.

Later, Mondello Beach grew into a tourist destination and it is currently considered the main seaside resort of Palermo, although the district remains essentially a residential area.

== Toponymy ==
Historical evidences show that Mondello's name has been in regular use since at least the 16th century, but its etymological origins remain uncertain. According to the version most accredited by researchers, it appears to be an Italian alteration of the Arabic Al Mondellu, which means "The Swamp", because during the Islamic domination of Sicily, between the 10th and 11th centuries, the area was known for the presence of a marsh on the south-eastern side of the bay. In support of this thesis, it is known that Muslim sailors referred to the small port of Mondello Bay as Marsa 'at Tin, which means "Port of Mud".

== History ==
=== Ancient history ===
The area has been settled since the Upper Paleolithic. Prehistoric tribes used the caves in the mountains surrounding Mondello as dwellings and, in some cases, as places of shamanic ritual.

During the Chalcolithic, with the changing climatic and social conditions, several villages with annexed necropolises arose in the vicinity of the current inhabited centre.

Around the 7th century BC the bay was regularly visited by Phoenician sailors, as demonstrated by the discovery of a sanctuary dedicated to the ancient goddess Isis in a cave on Mount Gallo known as Cave Regina (or Cave Queen), which was used as a place of worship since the prehistoric age.

The Greek historian Polybius mentioned that the Carthaginian general Hamilcar Barca used Mondello as a landing point for his fleet during the First Punic War, in the 3rd century BC.

During the years of Roman domination, the intense deforestation of Mount Pellegrino caused the formation of a swamp in a section of the area known as Valdesi, on the southern side.

=== Medieval and early modern history ===
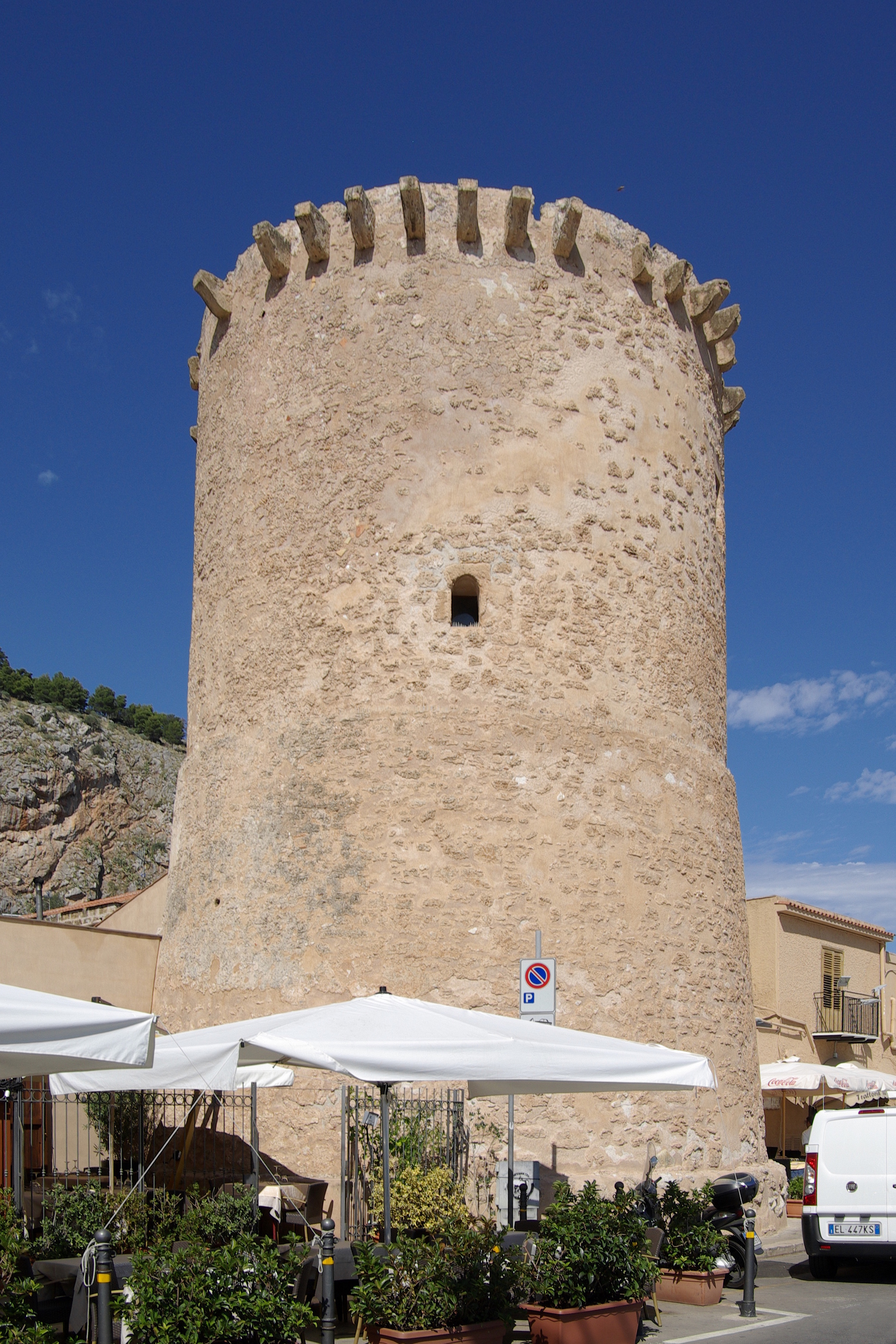
Late medieval defensive tower in the borough's main square

In medieval times a small village arose on the northern edge of the bay. The community prospered economically due to the abundant profits from fishing and agriculture.

In the early 15th century a tuna fishery was built, which quickly became the most successful business in the village.

Between the 15th and 17th centuries, the village was attacked many times by Barbary corsairs, who in that historical period continuously targeted the Italian coastal towns to plunder resources and kidnap people for the slave trade. The raids of Arab pirates, which had already marked the Sicilian island since the 7th century, became particularly dramatic starting from the second half of the 15th century, causing immense losses in all the maritime communities of Palermo.

As a response, the Senate of Palermo set up a system of coastal towers to ensure the defense of the territory and coordinate military defense. In the village of Mondello two were built; the first was placed near the fishing complex to protect the inhabitants and supplies in case of invasion, while the second one was positioned on the rock spur that closes the bay to the north-west, with the aim of spotting pirate sailing ships in advance and alerting the rest of the military forces for the counterattack. The two towers, which have survived to the present day, constitute an important testimony to the coastal defence system of Sicily.

=== Modern history ===
At the end of 18th century, a large part of the Mondello area was annexed to La Favorita Royal Estate, founded by King Ferdinand I of the Two Sicilies following the transfer of the Bourbon court to Palermo in 1798.

The part of Mondello included in the estate corresponded mainly to the Valdesi marsh, which the sovereign exploited for fishing trips due to the particular species that populated it, and the surrounding lands, which were looked after to enhance their landscape qualities.

In 1860 a malaria epidemic originated in the marshy area of Valdesi due to the rise in average temperatures, which favored the proliferation of harmful insects. The disease caused the death of hundreds of people, mostly families of workers in the marshy plains and in the immediately surrounding lands. A good number of those who had not been infected abandoned the area, which quickly became depopulated.

In 1865, a local nobleman called Francesco Lanza Spinelli established a committee with the aim of stopping malaria infections by draining the marsh waters definitively. Under his guidance several studies were promoted over a period of about 25 years, the most functional of which involved the abandonment of the drainage canals, planning to build a horseshoe-shaped collector for the water. The project was approved in 1889 and the works were completed in a few years. The area lost its humidity and this led to the definitive disappearance of the ponds that made up the Valdesi swamp.

At the end of the 19th century, the village celebrated the disappearance of malaria and began to be frequented more by occasional visitors who went there by carriage to enjoy the coast, a trend that led to the birth of the first resorts on Mondello beach.

=== Contemporary history ===
After the reclamation of Valdesi's swamp, the area attracted the interest of numerous entrepreneurs from all over Western Europe due to its landscape qualities.

From 1912 onwards, Mondello became the seat of the high bourgeoisie and the aristocracy. The nobility of the city fostered the construction of several exclusive and aristocratic circles, the construction of villas and the exploitation of lush gardens. King Ferdinand of Bourbon called it "a corner of paradise". Eventually, the beach of Mondello was born.

== Geography ==
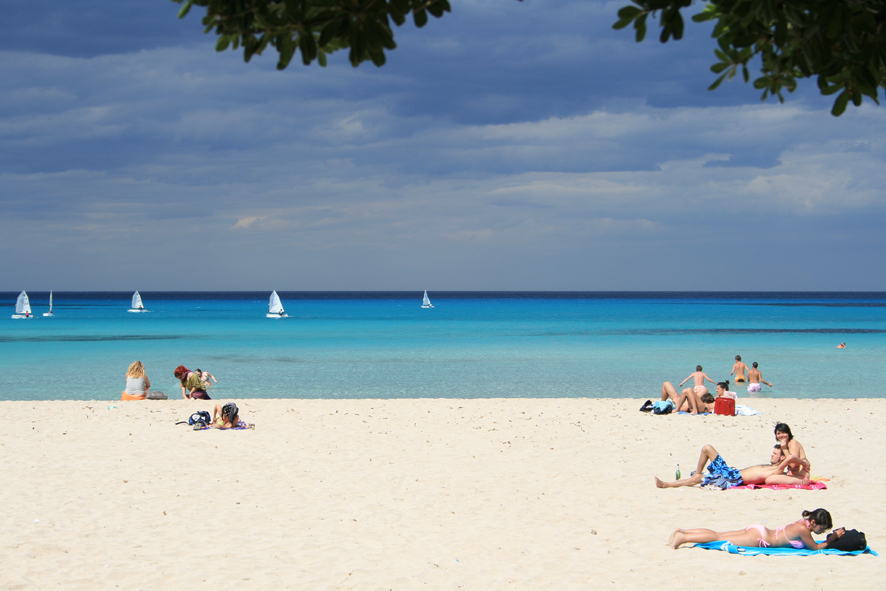
Mondello-Valdesi Beach

Mondello is a residential district located on the north-western coast of the city of Palermo, around a semicircular bay that extends for about 1.5 km (0.93 mi) and is enclosed between two promontories, Mount Pellegrino to the south-east and Mount Gallo to the north-west. It is separated from downtown Palermo by La Favorita Park, founded at the end of the 18th century by King Ferdinand I of the Two Sicilies and which today represents the largest urban garden in the city with an area of 400 hectares.

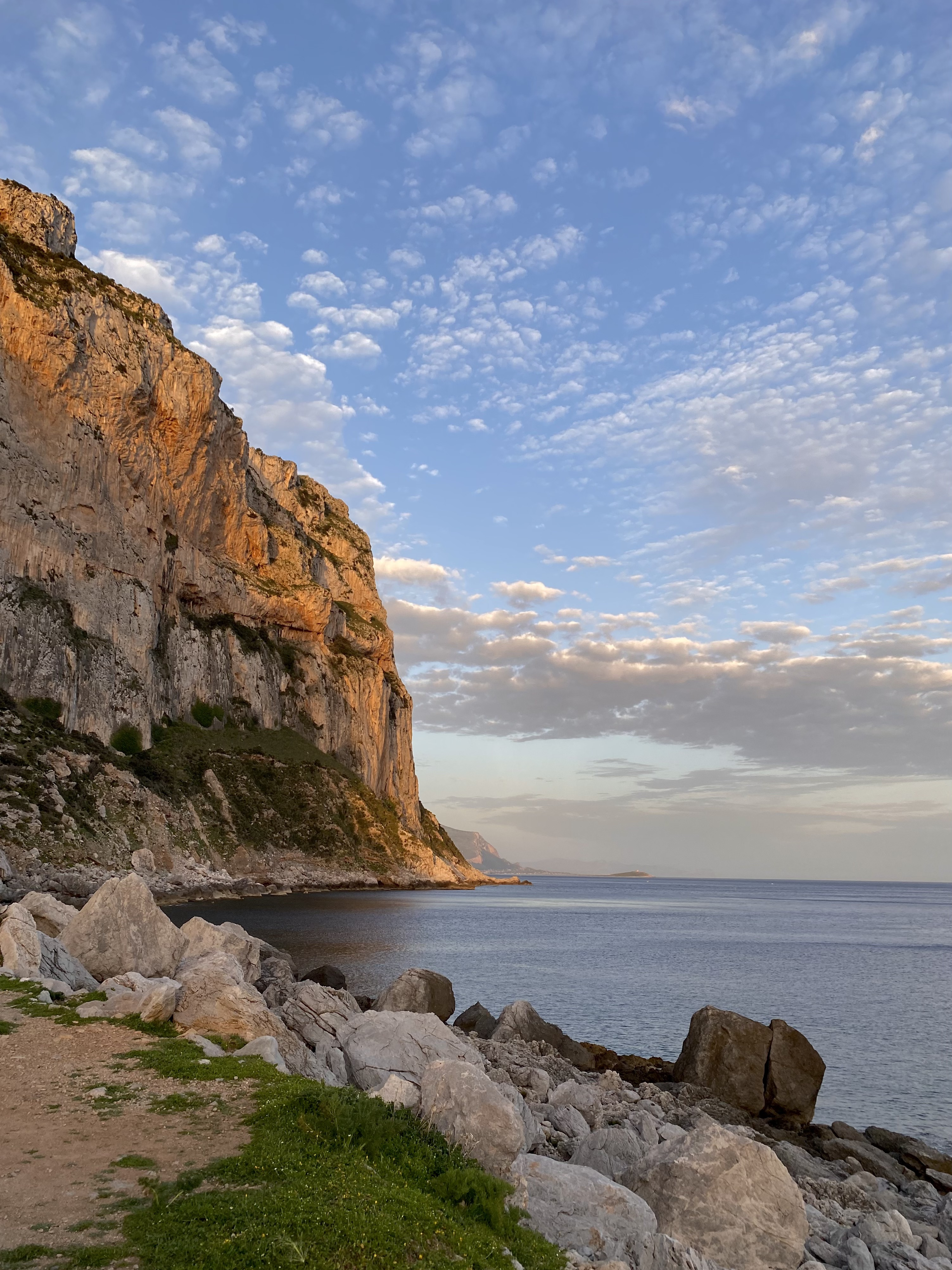
Cliffs in the Mondello's section of Capo Gallo Nature Reserve

The bay is sandy, except at the northern and southern ends where the coast is rocky due to the cliffs of the two promontories. The stretch of sandy coast, known as Mondello-Valdesi Beach, is the most famous beach in Palermo and one of the best-known in Sicily.

The district is generally divided into two urban sections; the one encompassing and surrounding the old seaside hamlet, commonly referred to as Mondello Village, and the Valdesi area. The latter had once become a swamp due to human activity during the Roman rule and was exploited for centuries primarily as a salt mine. It was then reclaimed at the end of the 19th century and subjected to development.

Mondello includes parts of the nature reserves established near the promontories that surround it; Monte Pellegrino Nature Reserve and Capo Gallo Nature Reserve, founded in 1996 and 2001 respectively. It is the only district of Palermo to encompass sections of both reserves.

== Culture ==
=== Architecture ===
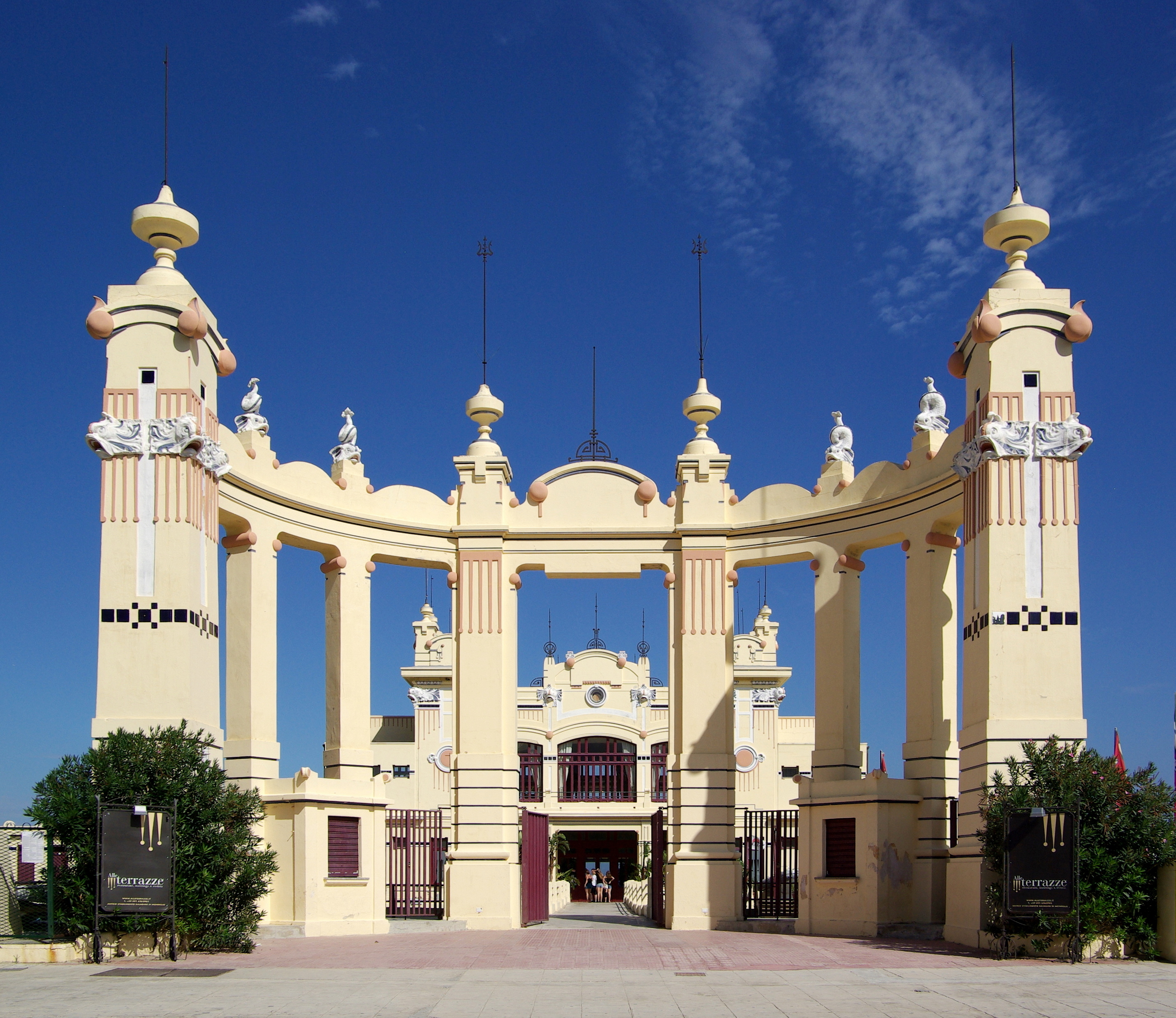
Antico Stabilimento Balneare of Mondello

Mondello has noteworthy architecture in various styles, most of which date back to the early 20th century building development. The Liberty style is the one for which the neighborhood is most recognized, thanks to the designs of Ernesto Basile and the modernist architects who were his students. There are also several Neo-Gothic and Moorish Revival villas, as well as examples of vernacular architecture.

== Bibliography ==
- P.Hardy, A. Bing, A. Blasi, C. Bonetto, K. Christiani, Italy, pp. 759–60, Lonely Planet.
- W. Dello Russo, Spiagge in Sicilia, Sime Books.
- Michelin, M. Magni, M. Marca, Sicilia, p. 90, La Guida Verde 2013
- Sicilia, p. 39, Lonely Planet, EDT 2013
