= Benjamin Fink =

Investor, financier, speculator, and politician, from Melbourne, Australia

Benjamin Josman Fink, at the height of his power, c.1887

Benjamin Josman Fink (1847–1909). always better known as B. J. Fink, was a Melbourne-based investor, financier, land and property speculator, and politician. First emerging as a major furniture retailer, he also invested in mining and the Georges department store. Fink established Mercantile Finance, which became his main company, among many other public companies with which he was associated. He was a major participant in the Melbourne land boom during the late 1880s—becoming known as the 'Prince of Speculators'—and with the subsequent crash of 1891-1893, which badly damaged his reputation. Fink's and his companies' financial failures were so large as to be significant in the banking crisis of 1893. Fink was an independent member for Maryborough and Talbot in the Legislative Assembly of the Victorian Parliament from 1883 to 1889. The Block Arcade in Melbourne, which was built for Fink, is a remnant of his once extensive property holdings.

His wife, Catherine Fink (1854–1943), managed the Fink family fortune, first at least nominally, after Fink's financial failure, and subsequently in fact, after his death. Soon after the times of Fink's death and their son's death, and during the First World War, she made some large philanthropic donations.

== Early years and family background ==
Fink was born on 21 April 1847, at St Pierre (Saint Peter Port), on Guernsey, one of the Channel Islands. He was the eldest son of Moses Fink (c. 1810–1885) and his wife Gertrude nee Ascher (c.1822–1893). His mother was a sister of the composer and pianist Joseph Ascher. His paternal grandfather, also Benjamin Josman (or Jossman) Fink, was a German-born rabbi.

Fink went to the Jews College in London, for around two years. It is now a rabbinical college, but also had a day school, until 1880. He did not complete his schooling there.

In April 1861, Fink's family arrived in Melbourne, aboard the ship Suffolk. At the time that they migrated, the family included four daughters and five sons, and another daughter—named Victoria—was born in Victoria. The family settled in Geelong, and Moses Fink initially worked for Hirsch Fink, as an itinerent hawker. Hirsch Fink, Fink's uncle, had been in business at Geelong, as a wholesale grocer and wine and spirit merchant since 1852.

Fink attended the Flinders School at Geelong for around two years. Two of his younger brothers, Woolfe Fink (1853–1914) and Theodore Fink (1855–1942), also attended that school, and later Geelong College. However, the Fink family moved to Melbourne, in 1871, and both those brothers attended Melbourne Grammar School. While there, Theodore was a classmate of Alfred Deakin, who became his lifelong friend. The two younger brothers both subsequently attended the University of Melbourne.

Woolfe Fink became a barrister and scholar of the classics and Shakespearean works. He would succeed Fink, as chairman of the Federal Hotels Group. His daughter was Molly Fink. Theodore Fink became a prominent lawyer in Melbourne, was the member for Jolimont and West Richmond, from 1894 until 1904, and became chairman of the board of Herald and Sportsman Newspapers Co. Ltd., which in 1902 became Herald and Weekly Times Limited.

Fink had two other brothers, Mark (or Marc) Fink (1848–1927) and Magnus Fink (1850–1915). After participating in the 'Hokitiki' [sic] gold rush in New Zealand, Mark (or Marc) worked in Western Australia, where he worked for a time for Alexander Forrest, and became known to Alexander's brother John Forrest. Later, he lived at Brighton Beach in Melbourne. He was an active investor in various gold mines, including at Mount Browne, near Tibooburra. He became chairman of the Federal Hotels Group, after the previous chairman, his brother Woolfe, died in 1914. Magnus Fink became a farmer on land at Buln Buln, in West Gippsland, although he did have some minor involvement in Benjamin Fink's ventures.

Fink's elder sister, Cornelia (c.1846–c.1938) married Oscar Brandt, of Ballarat, in 1869, linking the Fink and Brandt families. Oscar Brandt became a pawnbroker at Geelong in 1872, and was later involved in some of Fink's companies. Brandt names were associated with various businesses that were also associated with the Fink family, well into the early 1900s. Fink's younger sister, Theodora (1851–1927), married a barrister, Samuel Leon (1849–1933). In 1885, Fink's youngest sister, Victoria (1863–?) married Thomas Aitken, second son of his namesake, the late owner of the Victoria Parade Brewery and creator of Victoria Bitter.

Fink had two other younger sisters; Bernice Fink (c.1860–?) seems to have remained unmarried, at very least until middle age, and Lucretia Fink (c.1854–1939), a mandolin and piano teacher, remained a spinster at the time of her death.

On 14 October 1874, Fink married his Geelong-born cousin, Hirsch Fink's only daughter, Catherine Fink (1854–1943). Later described as "a tall handsome woman", she became vital to Fink's family's retaining or recovering much of its wealth, during the 1890s. After Fink's death in 1909, she continued to manage the family's investments.

== Early work career (1863 - 1874) ==
For around three years, from when he was 16, Fink was an importer and trader of produce, on the New Zealand goldfields. His younger brother Mark (or Marc) was also in New Zealand, on the Hokitika goldfield, during the 1860s. There were businesspeople of Jewish background on that goldfield during the rush years.

Fink began working as a clerk at the firm of Wallach Brothers in Melbourne, in 1865. In the same year, Wallach Brothers opened a large furniture store and showroom in Elizabeth Street Melbourne, and merged with S. Wallach and Co. Fink was still a clerk in 1868.

In mid 1869, Wallach Brothers advertised that they had received a shipment of Schwechten's pianos, and in August 1870 advertised the arrival of "another large assortment of these superior instruments". Two more shipments arrived in 1871. Schwechten pianos seem to have been selling quickly. Fink was a gifted pianist, and that helped his becoming a very successful piano and furniture salesman for Wallach Brothers.

== Early business career (1874 - 1879) ==
=== Wallach Brothers ===
Fink became a partner of Wallach Brothers. It is unclear what share of the business he owned or when he became a partner, but he did not need to buy his share. An biographical account, from 1887, states, "That perseverance, integrity, and application which have characterised his whole life, aided him in a few years in securing a partnership in that firm without the cost of any outlay." In June 1874, the partnership with Julius Wallach was dissolved, with Fink assuming sole control of the business.

During the 1860s and 1870s there was a shipping company, also 'Wallach Brothers', with an address of 153 Lower George St, Sydney. It should not be confused with Fink's retailer Wallach Brothers, which did not have a presence in Sydney until the early 1880s.

In 1879, Fink was suffering ill health, and he stood down from day to day management of Wallach Brothers, but retained ownership of the business. After a short period of rest to recover his health, he focused on investment and speculation. It was also in 1879, that Maurice Aron became Fink's partner in Wallach Brothers.

== Investment and speculation (1879 - 1889) ==
=== Gearing ===
Fink had probably borrowed to buy Wallach Brothers, and it was a financing strategy—now known as 'gearing' or 'leverage'—that he continued to use, as an investor and speculator. Gearing involves purchasing an asset, usually using some capital, but covering most of the purchase price using debt financing. At an extreme, the purchase of the asset can be financed by debt alone. However, if the asset falls in value repossessing the asset can result in a loss for the lender if there was insufficient equity capital provided by the debtor.

Another way of gearing is to buy an asset, and then mortgage it afterwards. Fink would later use this approach in his career, allowing a perception of ownership to exist, while freeing up cash for other purposes.

Successful application of gearing is predicated upon either rising value of the assets or upon increasing the cash flow derived from the asset. If asset prices rise, gearing increases the return for a given amount of capital investment. However, if asset prices fall sufficiently, the original capital investment can be wiped out entirely, leaving only the debt.

=== Mining Investments ===
==== Coal mine ====
Victorian investors had poured around £70,000 into a venture, known as the Australasia Coal Company Limited, which was developing a coal mine at Winding Creek—now Cardiff—near Lake Macquarie. This was at a time of major growth in the N.S.W. coal industry. The company's first chairman was James Munro, a name that would figure prominently in the later land boom, and its unravelling. Later its chairman was James Francis. The mine development was mismanaged. The investment was wasted, because funding ran out before the company's mineshaft reached the coal seams. An attempted capital reconstruction failed, and the company ended up in liquidation with its assets put up for sale by auction.

In what was one of his earliest purely speculative ventures, in September 1879, Fink bought the assets of Australasian Coal Company from its liquidators, for £8,500 (some sources say for £9,000). He then sold off the company's nearly-new machinery, realising an immediate profit.

He retained the mine itself. Fink stated that he intended to reopen the Australasia Coal Company Limited coal mine, once the Sydney-Newcastle railway line was completed. After the time that he bought the coal mine, he bought grazing properties in the Cobar area. The mine never reopened, and the land and a railway corridor to it was resumed by the Crown in 1907.

==== Gold mining ====
Fink made investments in deep lead mines around Maryborough, including Napier, New Kong Meng, Chalk, and Duke mines. He was behind the Lord Nelson Gold Mining Company, St. Arnaud, and involved in other mines including the Great Southern Consols, at Rutherglen.

His revival of the mines brought popularity in Marybourough, leading to his becoming an elected representative for the area, in the Legislative Assembly of Victoria, from 1883 to 1889.

=== Banking ===
Fink established a bank, known as the Mining and Agricultural Bank of Australasia, at Ballarat, in August 1881. It had authorised capital of £1,000,000, in 200,000 shares of £5 each. The initial issue was of 100,000 shares, of which 75,000 were reserved for the promoters of the bank. 25,000 were offered to the public, at a 10 shilling premium. It began business in October 1881, after changing its name to the Joint Stock Bank of Victoria—it had no connection with the similarly-named but far larger Australian Joint Stock Bank—and was buying gold as a part of its business.

Fink's Joint Stock Bank of Victoria merged with the larger, City of Melbourne Bank, in 1882. Fink and other Joint Stock Bank of Victoria shareholders received a significant shareholding in the merged banking venture, which carried on under the name of City of Melbourne Bank. Fink remained a shareholder until 1891, when he sold his shares. He ceased to be a director around the same time.

City of Melbourne Bank had resulted from the renaming of Victoria Finance and Agency Company in October 1873. It sought subscribers for its shares in November 1873. It raised more capital in 1877. It gave every sign of being a conventional, profitable colonial bank. A Scottish immigrant, who had banking experience in Scotland and Mauritius, Colin Longmuir (c.1841-1894), joined the City of Melbourne Bank, as an accountant, in 1876. Four years later, Longmuir became the general manager, a post he then held until his death.

=== Mercantile Finance ===
In May 1881, The Lyell and Gowan business was folded into a new company, The Mercantile, Finance, Guarantee and Agency Company (Limited), with an authorised capital of £100,000, which was when Fink became involved. Andrew Lyell would remain the manager until 1888. The original company's shareholders were private investors.

In 1885, a new publicly-listed company was formed to take over the operations of the old. The new company, Mercantile Finance Guarantee and Agency Company Limited, had an authorised capital of £500,000 (in 100,000 shares of £5 each). The initial float was for 25,000 shares, of which 9,000 were offered to the public. Those shares were initially issued partly-paid, leaving £3 15s for later calls if needed. The nature of the business also changed to allow administration of deceased estates, negotiation of mortgages, and other investment functions. The public offer was reportedly oversubscribed.

Fink was a director of the new public company. Others directors included John Munro Bruce a respected Melbourne businessman—father of Stanley Bruce— Orlando Fenwick, a retail draper and former mayor of Melbourne, Godwin George Crespin (G.G. Crespin), a Melbourne merchant, and Cornelius Job Ham (C.J. Ham), a prominent Melbourne auctioneer. The chairman was John Whittingham, a wealthy merchant and grazier. The managing director was Andrew Lyell, a prominent Melbourne businessman and accountant who was close to Fink and had managed the earlier company. Up until 1880, he was MLA for Emerald Hill. The company secretary was John McAllister Howden, who was to become a close associate of Fink and was Andrew Lyell's son-in-law.

=== Furniture retailing and stores ===
==== Wallachs Brothers ====
Melbourne was growing rapidly, its economy boosted by gold mining, and business was buoyant. Fink and his partner Maurice Aron expanded the business to other Australian colonies, opening branches in Sydney and in South Australia. They also opened a vast new store in Melbourne in 1887.

==== W.H Rocke ====
W.H. Rocke, the principal of a large furniture concern, died in December 1882. In 1884, Wallach Brothers bought W. H. Rocke's furniture business, giving him control of the most important retail outlets for high quality furniture.

Wallach's Furnishing Emporium, Elizabeth St, Melbourne, c1888 (from Catalogue of Melbourne Centennial Exhibition)

W.H. Rocke furniture warehouse, Collins St, Melbourne (1901)

Newly-opened Wallach Brothers store, at Wynyard Square, Sydney (1888)

Another view of Wallach Brothers, Sydney (1888)

== Politics (1883-1889) ==
Fink was one of the two members representing the electorate of Maryborough and Talbot in the Legislative Assembly of the Victorian Parliament, from 1 February 1883 until 1 March 1889. Fink represented the area, where most of his gold mining Investments were located, as an independent. His popularity rested on his having saved several mines in the area from closure.

Speaking around the time of Fink's death in 1909, a unnamed Minister of the Victorian Government recalled that, "Mr Fink was anything but a loquacious member, but when mining questions were before the House he showed himself well informed regarding them. Pleasant and genial in manner, he was well liked by members." Fink's biographer, Michael Cannon concluded that, "his political career remained always subservient to his business".

Benjamin Fink was not the only 'land boomer' to sit in the Legislative Assembly of Victoria; others included James Munro (a Premier), Thomas Bent, (later a Premier), James Mirams, and Matthew Henry Davies (the Speaker, and in 1887, chairman of the Royal Commission on Banking). What is now known as a conflict of interest, seems not to have been considered an obstacle to political office.

== The Land Boom ==
The Melbourne land boom of the 1880s was an economic boom that culminated in a speculative bubble, during the years 1885 to 1889. Although now primarily associated with land and property, there was a concurrent stock market boom, accompanied by numerous company floats, many of a highly speculative nature.

In his 1929 book, The Pleasant Career of a Spendthrift, George Meudell described Benjamin Fink's financial situation at the beginning of the land boom; "When the boom opened he was interested in the five leading furniture shops of Melbourne and was worth £250,000, solidly and unencumbered. He was making twenty thousand pounds a year, and why he went into the land boom cesspit is not understandable."

=== Mercantile, Finance, Trustees and Agency Company (1888) ===
The name 'Mercantile Finance' will always be associated with Benjamin Fink. It was an abbreviation of the various names of his main financial vehicle. It was officially known as The Mercantile, Finance, Guarantee and Agency Company Limited, and its final form, from 1888, The Mercantile, Finance, Trustees and Agency Company of Australia Limited.

The change in the company's name in 1888, was associated with the announcement of two important changes. First ,"in view of the fiduciary character of the company and its extensive connection, the board resolved to give practical effect to the powers contained in its memorandum of association of conducting, the business of a trustees and executors company, and, with that object, the name of the company has been altered, and application made to Parliament for an enabling act." Second, "To allow of the company dealing more extensively in real property agencies, and especially in connection with the trustees and executors department, negotiations were opened with the Messrs C. J and T Ham for the amalgamation of their old and well-known business and this company." It also undertook a major capital raising.

=== Austral Otis Elevator and Engineering Company Limited (1887) ===
The Melbourne Hydraulic Power Company, was established, in 1886. It made available high-pressure piped water, allowing the use of hydraulically-powered elevators in the new high-rise buildings being built in Melbourne. A business, originally known as Hughes, Pye and Rigby, established in 1878, secured the rights to the Otis Elevator Company's patents in Australia, and became the local manufacturers of Otis elevators.

Paying £6000 to the original owners, the business was incorporated as a public company, Austral Otis Elevator and Engineering Company, in November 1887. It was not floated on the stock exchange; instead, shareholders subscribed privately for the shares. Fink was its chairman. Edward Hughes (c.1842-1898) and Edward Joseph Rigby (1859-1948) remained as co-managing directors.

== The peak of the boom (1888-1890) ==
=== The warning signs ===
By 1889, land values had risen to such an extent that it was clear to many that a speculative bubble existed. Land was the security for the many loans, and the lending organisations were heavily exposed should land prices fall, as were the share prices of the 'land banks'. Commercial and residential property was also becoming an uneconomic as a 'geared' investment. Depositors expected a 6% return, but rental yields—compressed by overly high valuations—had fallen to 2.5%. The boom in commercial property too could not last. Land sales slowed and rents began to fall, indicating that the boom had peaked.

In the final phase of the land boom, some major players and companies had tried to hold on, by borrowing even more, rather than selling out at a loss, making their final indebtedness markedly worse. An example was Bourke Street Freehold & Investment Company, a company formed in August 1888, by Fink and other land boomers, to buy a large city block on Russell Street between Bourke and Little Collins Streets.

However, sourcing funds from London was becoming more difficult. During 1889, John McAlister Howden, made a visit to London to attempt to borrow funds there for Mercantile Finance and other companies under the control of Benjamin Fink. In a report to Melbourne he stated, "Australian matters and especially Melbourne interests were all under a cloud and every statement in connection with them were [sic] regarded with suspicion. Rumours were current about our company, which were even more exaggerated than in Melbourne."

Fink also sought to raise funds by floating new public companies (see below), and also from the fees and commissions that could be obtained doing so.

Others sought to offload overvalued land and property holdings to new investors, applying the 'greater fool theory'. An example was Australian City and Suburban Investment and Banking Company Limited, set up around August 1888, to acquire large parcels of land from George William Taylor (1840–c. 1920), with shares being offered to the public. But falling land values, left the inevitably indebted land owners facing a capital loss.

In December 1889, Premier Permanent Building Society suspended payments to depositors and closed its doors. There were allegations of gross mismanagement, later culminating in criminal convictions. It had lent more than three times its paid up capital and used its own loans as security. This society's secretary was Jame Mirams, who was among the first land boomers to have a 'liquidation by arrangement', in March 1890, paying his creditors just 2d. in the pound.

David Munro (1844–1898), a wealthy engineer, contractor, and manufacturer of machinery, was another of the 'land boomers' to declare his personal insolvency, in April 1890. As a contractor, Munro had built two fine bridges across the Yarra River—Princes Bridge and Queens Bridge—and two railway lines. Plunging into land speculation, he had taken large loans from banks to purchase land for subdivision. Using his wife's name, Munro had borrowed further large amounts from Fink's Mercantile Finance, which he had also used to speculate in land. He had floated a 'land bank', Caledonian Land Bank Ltd, but some of its shareholders accused him of selling his properties, at Brighton and Canterbury, into the float of that company, at inflated valuations, leading to demands that Munro buy their shares. His business David Munro and Co. Limited had a large overdraft from the City of Melbourne Bank. The bank insisted that Munro give up the management of his hitherto successful business, thereby damaging its performance. That led to a call on the shares, which he could not meet. Having run out of options, he declared insolvency, as did his wife. Munro died, in greatly reduced circumstances, of a haemorrhage and by then his chronic alcoholism, in 1898.

=== Floating new companies ===
Seemingly undeterred by signs that the boom had peaked, it was during the years from 1888 to 1890 that Benjamin Fink initiated some of his most audacious schemes, by floating new public companies. These floats generated income, in the form of fees and commissions for the company Fink controlled, Mercantile Finance, but he also made money through the deals themselves.

Fink was not alone in floating new companies, during the frenzied period near the peak of the boom. In the financial year ending in June 1888, at least 270 new companies were registered in Melbourne; these had a combined nominal capital of £50-million, paid up to £25-million.

==== Australian City and Suburban Investment and Banking Company Limited (1888) ====
Australian City and Suburban Investment and Banking Company Limited was set up around August 1888 to acquire large parcels of land, totalling 35,024 acres, from G.W.Taylor. The lands were described as being, "along the sea coast from Brighton to Mordialloc; in the east in Caulfield, Glen Iris, Oakleigh, and the surrounding neighbourhood; in the north-east Preston; is well represented; in the north, Essendon, Pascoevale, and the adjacent country commands a leading place. Valuable areas are also held in Lilydale, Dandenong, Berwick, Bacchus Marsh, and other advancing neighbourhoods within easy distance of the metropolis." The company sought to raise new capital with a public issue of 500,000 shares, while 900,000 £2 shares were issued paid to £1, presumably to interests associated with the share issue. The Chairman was Alfred Deakin. Fink was an underwriter of the companies initial share issue, and as a consequence held some shares in it.

==== McCracken's Brewery (1888) ====
R. McCracken Brewing Company company was producing a popular light amber coloured beer, using technologies that made its products consistently of good quality, despite high volumes. It had many 'tied houses' which ensured volume. It generated good profits. Its long-established brewery sat on potentially valuable land in Collins Street, and its value could be realised by relocating the brewery operation to a more industrial area.

After the death of Robert McCracken, the R. McCracken Brewing Company was controlled by his son Alexander McCracken and his nephew, Coiler McCracken, the son of Peter McCracken (1818 - 1892). In February 1888, Fink made an offer to them, for the right to float the company; he would pay them £250,000. A memorandum of understanding was signed at that time, and a contract was signed in March 1888. A prospectus was issued in late March 1888. Fink's company Mercantile Finance and another company, were brokers for the float of the newly-formed McCracken's City Brewery Company, Limited. At the time of the float, a letter to the editor of the The Herald, from a reader who signed as "Investor", pointed out that some aspects of the prospectus were not easily understood.

When McCracken's City Brewery Company Limited was floated, the vendor was B.J. Fink, not the McCracken family, but that was not explicitly stated in the prospectus. The prospectus stated an authorised capital up to £2,000,000. The assets were bought by the new company for £750,000. The float proceeded with issued shares with capital of £1,000,000, paid-up capital of £500,000, and another £500,000 to be raised as debentures. The new company had paid Fink, for the Collins Street frontages, at what were called 'boom prices', inflating the price of buying the brewery operation. The balance sheet of the new company did not separate goodwill, from the freehold properties, leaseholds and hotels, all was lumped together as a single amount of £750,000. Preliminary expenses of floating the company and selling its debentures came to £30,645.

As well as being vendor, Fink was the chairman of the board of the new company. Fink and both the McCrackens were significant shareholders in the new company. Fink received 130,000 shares—of the 200,000 that were reserved for 'the vendor' under the prospectus—in the new company, which were later sold at a large profit and the proceeds applied to other investments.

A comparison with other Melbourne brewing companies, made in May 1892, showed the new venture to have a much higher capitalisation—both subscribed and paid-up—than any of five other Melbourne brewery companies. It was either far superior to other brewery businesses, or over capitalised and overvalued. Operating in a fiercely competitive market, the profit for the first year was £31,970. The new company was also heavily indebted; there were £500,000 worth of 4.5% debentures issued in London, in June 1889, with the net proceeds of £477,000 used as part of the payment to the vendor, Fink. The interest payment due on debentures was £22,500, annually. The effect of the high capitalisation and indebtedness was immediately apparent, by the first annual meeting of the company, in February 1890. The 'vendors' (Fink) had to top up the first dividend amount by £2,225, to £40,000, because a guarantee of an 8% dividend for the first three years had been given.

==== George and George Limited (1888) ====
George's—officially George and George's—was a long established department store in Melbourne. Fink's company Mercantile Finance acted as broker for the float of George and George, Limited, in April 1888.

The company was formed to take over the businesses of George and George—described a draper and tailoring business—and what were described as "the successful part" of the Equitable Store, a grocery. The prospectus noted that the Equitable Store had "suffered from difficulties incident to the co-operative principle, but which in the new concern will be entirely obviated." The owner of the Equitable Store, Equitable Co-operative Society Limited, had resolved to sell their leasehold over the Collins Street building that they used, to assist resolving financial difficulties, in April 1887. In 1888, they voted to merge the Equitable Store with George and George.

Fink was a founding director of the new George and George, Limited, becoming its chairman. Alfred Harley George (1857–1930), one of the founders of George and George, was co-managing director, with John Marshall, formerly of the Equitable Store.

The capital of the new company was 150,000 £1 shares, of which 110,000 were issued at the float. 36,104 shares were offered to the public, to be partly paid to 10s in two instalments. The remainder were allocated, "as part payment" to the shareholders of George and George and the shareholders of the Equitable Co-operative Society Limited. The former received 12,500 shares paid up to £1 and 25,000 Shares paid up to 10s, and the latter 36,396 shares paid up to £1.

==== Mercantile Investment Trust (1888) ====
The Mercantile Investment Trust, with capital of £500,000, was registered in June 1888, and began operation around August 1888. It would be one of the first of Fink's ventures to fail spectacularly, at least from the viewpoint of its shareholders. Fink was chairman, his close associate, John McAlister Howden, was a director, and George Meudell was the company secretary.

Its decline was rapid. Shareholders voted to put it into voluntary liquidation in November 1889. The shareholders, including Fink himself, were left liable for unpaid share calls. Five eighths of its investment was in shares of Mercantile Finance. Reportedly, investors in the trust had already lost around £100,000, up to April 1889, as the Mercantile Finance share price fell, without receiving any dividend.

Speaking at the first half-yearly shareholders meeting in March 1889, Fink said, "No doubt an error of judgement was committed in investing so largely in one particular stock but it was done with the very best intentions and at a time when a profit could have been made by the operation. No human foresight could have seen the result."

The trust was a means by which Fink offloaded some of his own large shareholding in Mercantile Finance, before its price—then at around £9, on share paid-up to just £2—began to fall. It also took up some newly-issued shares in the company, at the issue price of £7. The trust also inherited Fink's liability for future Mercantile Finance share calls.

==== The furniture monopoly (1890) ====
Fink bought Steinfield, Levinson and Company, around 1886, turning it into Maurice Aron and Company. He bought W.H. Rocke and Company on the death of Mr Rocke, in 1884. He already controlled Wallach Brothers, which by 1888 was a partnership between himself and Maurice Aron.

In April 1890, Fink moved to create what was later seen as a monopoly over furniture manufacturing and retailing in Melbourne. His sole partner in this venture was Maurice Aron. Three public companies were set up on the same day, 24 April 1890.

The three companies were; Maurice Aron and Company, Limited, formed "to acquire the furniture business carried on by B, J. Fink and Maurice Aron under the style of Maurice Aron and Company" , with 20,000 £5 shares; W. H. Rocke and Company, Limited, formed "to acquire the furniture business carried on by W. H. Rocke and Company, at 249 Collins-street", with 40,000 £5 shares; and "Wallachs Limited, formed "to acquire the furniture business carried on at 244 Elizabeth-street under the name of Wallach Bros", with 80,000 £5 shares. Shares in all the companies were paid up to £2 10s.

In all three companies, as it stood in 1892, Fink and Aron held just under half the shares on issue, each. The two men had, in combination, almost total ownership. There were a small number of other shareholders in the three companies, each one holding a token amount of shares, enough to satisfy legal requirements for a public company. The three companies, taken together, controlled most of the furniture market in Melbourne, but were notionally independent entities, albeit all half-owned by Fink and all half-owned by Aron.

=== Investments at the height of the boom ===
==== City buildings in Melbourne ====
In 1888, at the height of the land boom, Fink made huge investment in city buildings. Fink's Buildings was erected for him at a cost of £100,000. He bought the Cole's Book Arcade for £40,000, and Gresham's Buildings for £52,000.

In September 1889, the George and George's store known as the Federal Emporium, in Collins Street near Elizabeth Street, was gutted by fire. The damage to the building, by then owned by a company associated with Fink, was estimated by him at £30,000 and the stock lost—owned by the company George and George—at £50,000. Three firemen also died in the blaze, which also destroyed two adjacent premises and damaged some others due to smoke and water. Fink stated the George's building was insured for £18,000. George and George's stock was also insured. After the fire, a company associated with Fink, bought out George and George's, lease over the site—still with over 19 years to run—for £16,000.

It was on the site of the destroyed building that Fink later built the Block Arcade, between 1890 and 1893, when the last section of it was completed. The George and Georges business was continued from another site. It was subsequently centralised at another building, the former Equitable Store building, which had been extended by Fink through to Little Collins Street, at what is now 162 to 168 Collins Street. It remained there until the end of George's as a retailer, in 1995.

Fink also controlled at least four hotels.

==== Bourke Street Freehold & Investment Company ====
Fink and his family were involved in the Bourke Street Freehold & Investment Company, a company formed in August 1888 to buy a large city block on Russell Street, between Bourke and Little Collins Streets, from the Premier Building Land & Investment Association. Benjamin Fink, Theodore Fink, William Malpas, W.L. Baillieu, Thomas Fischer, and John McAlister Howden were directors. The shareholdings were dominated by members of the Munro, Baillieu and Fink families and their associates, including, W.L. Baillieu, his brother E.L. ‘Prince’ Baillieu, Donald Munro, Benjamin Fink, his wife Catherine, and his brother Theodore. The company secretary was Magnus Fink, another of Fink's brothers.

==== Federal Coffee Palace ====
Although he did not own the building of the Federal Coffee Palace—with 560 rooms, the largest of several 'coffee palaces', or 'dry' hotels, in Melbourne—he was influential in his role as chairman of the board of Federal Coffee Palace Limited, the building's owner. He became chairman in February 1890, around the time that one of its founders, James Mirams, a teetotaler, became insolvent. The other founder, also a teetotaler, James Munro, was close to Fink in his business dealings. Fink saw an opportunity to turn the business around, if a liquor license could be obtained. He was quoted as saying, "A wicked breach of trust was giving up that licence, which would now be worth £5,000 a year to us." The government was unwilling to allow the transfer of a liquor license from a smaller hotel. Otherwise, Fink and the other directors saw potential in converting the building or part of it to another use, such as office premises.

==== Illawarra Harbour port scheme ====
Fink was a member of the 'Great Dapto Syndicate', in the early days of the Illawarra Harbour port scheme. Others in this syndicate were Thomas Andrew de Wolf and Andrew Armstrong, a Sydney-based land developer and speculator. Fink's company, Mercantile Finance was later stated to have been, in 1893, a large shareholder in the company that was set up to create the port, Illawarra Harbour and Land Corporation.

==== Other companies associated with Benjamin Fink ====
In the words of Fink's biographer, Michael Cannon, during the land boon, nobody else had "started so many billowing companies" as Fink. Using public companies had two benefits for Fink; he shared the risk with other investors, when it suited him, and companies held title to assets, which he effectively controlled but were not assets in his name.

Following is a list of companies associated with Benjamin Fink that are not mentioned above:

- City Property Company Ltd - the company which owned the Block Arcade, and which had a leasehold over the Equitable Store building
- Clifton Hill to Northcote & Preston Tramway Company - built and operated the Clifton Hill-Northcote tramway; Fink was its chairman.
- Australian Electric Light Company
- Heights of Maribyrnong Estate Company Limited
- Melbourne Central Property Company Limited
- Mortgage Debenture Corporation Limited

=== Fink's homes in Melbourne ===
In 1875, the Fink family were living at No.2 Albert Terrace, in Albert Street, East Melbourne, (Note: House numbering in Melbourne worked differently in those times.) were Fink's son was born. In 1878, Fink bought 'Ensor' at 172 Victoria Parade, East Melbourne, and he and his family resided there from 1883 until 1889. The house still stands.

Fink's final Melbourne home was 'The Grange', on the corner of St Kilda Road and Domain Road, South Yarra. However, subsequent events showed that the title was in fact held by his wife, Catherine, until the end of 1893.

== The crash and its aftermath ==
=== The crash ===
It was not until the years from 1891 to 1893 that the full consequences of the excesses of the boom became apparent, through the successive financial failures of multiple 'land boomers', their various corporate structures, and ultimately some banks. The massive destruction of wealth also affected the general economy, making matters worse; businesses closed, and ceased to pay rents, depositors lost their savings, and workers lost their jobs.

The final trigger of the inevitable crash came in the form of the Baring crisis of November 1890. It related to loans made by Barings Bank to the far away country of Argentina. Argentina defaulted on loans of nearly £48,000,000 during 1890. British bankers and investors with loans to Australian banks and other financial institutions feared a repeat of the Argentinean circumstances in Australia. British funding dried up, and with it the means by which some of the land boom entities were hanging on.

In a rising property market, the investment in commercial properties that had rental incomes had seemed sensible, but as values fell the companies owning property, such as Bourke Street Freehold & Investment Company, struggled to stay afloat, without selling the properties at a loss. In desperation, in 1891, that company mortgaged all its properties to a prominent Melbourne merchant, James Graham. That staved off insolvency, for a time, but it increased the interest due, to £7,000 annually. As businesses renting premises in the buildings closed down, due to the declining economy, the rental income fell further. In the end, the company would need to be liquidated. Shareholders, such as Fink and his family, would then became liable for unpaid calls on partly-paid shares, which were then virtually worthless.

=== Benjamin Fink's financial problems ===
As one of the largest players in the land boom, it seemed inevitable that Fink would be affected by the crash. However, in July 1892, shareholders of his main company, Mercantile Finance, were told that although calls on shares would be needed, "there was every prospect of this company, meeting all its engagements and having a balance left for shareholders".

Some of Fink's paper fortune depended upon the value of shares that he owned, and as confidence fell, share prices headed downward. The value of shares in Mercantile Finance had been falling; over the three years to February 1892, its shares (paid-up to £2) fell in value from £9 10s to just 1s. In the week before 17 February 1892, the share price fell from £2 to just 1s., as rumours circulated that one of the company's guarantees would be called up.

Fink was known to owe various banks large amounts, personally, under what were understood at the time to be secured loans. There were also guarantees that he had given. The number and complexity, of his various financial arrangements, made an understanding of his true position difficult. Reports that Benjamin Fink had called a meeting of his creditors, in September 1892, were generally reported as causing relief.

One report stated, hopefully, that—despite a deficiency of £1,000,000— "The deficiency is stated by Mr Fink to be a balance-sheet deficiency, as all the institutions of which Mr Fink is guarantor are in good financial positions, and the parties holding Mr Fink's guarantees hold other securities and are for the most part fully covered quite apart from Mr Fink's guarantee." That turned out to be wishful thinking.

=== Fink's debts and assets ===
A report of Fink's financial position, in October 1892, stated that, "The creditors are grouped as follows :— 19 semi-private companies, in which Mr Fink is the leading shareholder. 7 public companies. 10 lessors, from whom Mr. Fink holds some 17 leases. 10 mortgage and finance institutions in Melbourne and Sydney. 11 banks in Melbourne and Sydney. 8 contracts of purchase which Mr. Fink has not fulfilled. There are no trade creditors or bills, as Mr. Fink conducted his manufacturing business on cash principles."

Fink's fully-secured creditors—owed £191,845 11s 4d—were, notionally, to be paid in full, by taking over the assets pledged as security. A slight surplus of security, £10,814 15d 2d, was counted as an asset. His partly-secured creditors—owed £375,950 6s 7d—would similarly be paid only to the extent of their security, contributing £163,555 14s 7d. to the deficiency. However, with assets—mainly land, buildings, and shares—collapsing in value as the boom deflated, the fully-secured creditors, as well as the partly-secured creditors, still faced very significant losses.

The unsecured debt contributed £878,244 3s 7d to the deficiency. £348, 748 of the unsecured debt was in the form of guarantees by Fink to others, and a similar amount was Fink's liability for share calls. The unsecured debt also included a loan, unsecured other than by Fink's own now worthless guarantee, of £90,000 from Mercantile Finance.

His assets (not including items already pledged as security to creditors) was stated to be only £22,524 10s 5d, Of that asset amount, the value of Fink's shareholdings was given as £11,326 14s, and that of his unencumbered landholdings was stated to be just £525.

Complicating visibility of these matters was a personal insolvency process, which became known as 'secret compositions', and potential abuses of the laws covering voluntary liquidation of companies. Inter-company loans and guarantees also obfuscated the situation, as an entity could be simultaneously both a creditor and a debtor. There were legal cases, as entities fought to recover what they could from the financial catastrophe, further delaying some resolution. In the case of Fink's financial affairs, it would take over a decade to finalise, and perhaps even then was never fully resolved.

=== 'Secret composition' and Fink's personal insolvency ===
A cartoonist's view of the operation of insolvency laws in Victoria in the wake of the crash. Note the bag labelled, 'Farthing in the Pound', a reference to Benjamin Fink's insolvency. Punch (Melbourne), 8 March 1894.

An aspect of the existing laws relating to insolvencies permitted creditors to agree to a 'composition' to satisfy a debtor's obligations to them, without insolvency proceedings or appointment of a trustee in bankruptcy. The composition had to be registered with the Insolvency Court, but otherwise only need be made known to the debtor and the creditors. These were the infamous 'secret compositions'—more correctly, ‘composition by arrangement’—by which land boomers avoided both public scrutiny of their financial predicament and the stigma of a formal bankruptcy.

An insolvent debtor needed to first call a meeting of their creditors, and present to the meeting a proposed arrangement to discharge the debt—typically via a discounted repayment—as a resolution to be put to a vote. A 75% majority of creditors accepting the arrangement was binding on all creditors, subject to confirmation at a second creditors' meeting. Once such a composition was deposited with the clerk of the Insolvency Court, a certificate discharging the debt would be issued.

A cartoonist's view of Fink's 'halfpenny in the pound' settlement with creditors. Punch (Melbourne) 10 November 1892.

Although only a relatively small fraction of insolvencies made use of 'secret compositions', the amounts involved were generally the larger ones. Fink made use of a 'secret composition', in September 1892. Fink's lawyer brother, Theodore, arranged numerous 'secret compositions' for land boom figures, but also was the subject of two of his own, in January and July 1892. Another of Fink's brother, Marc (or Mark) Fink, followed the same process in October 1892; Fink was among his brother's creditors. Others to make 'secret compositions' were associates of Fink in various ventures, W. L. Baillieu, James Mirams, one the first in March 1890, and Andrew Lyell, another early one, in October 1890.

Inevitably, details or rumoured details of the 'secret compositions' became known to the press, and hence the public. Benjamin Fink's 'secret composition' was reported as being only a farthing in the pound, earning him, the nickname 'Farthing Fink', and resulted in legal proceedings. The eventual outcome was an improvement for his creditors, but only to a halfpenny in the pound.

When some of the creditors were actually controlled by the debtor, there was an inherent conflict of interest in the 'secret composition process, under which creditors voted on the acceptability of the arrangement to settle the debts. In Fink's case, his creditors included,"19 semi-private companies, in which Mr, Fink is the leading shareholder". Fink had borrowed heavily from companies that he controlled, such as Wallachs Limited and Mercantile Finance, something not technically illegal, at the time, but at best unethical.

Together Fink's partly-secured and unsecured debtors faced a combined stated deficiency of £1,019,275. The news, in October 1892, that a majority of his creditors had agreed to accept just a halfpenny in the pound on that amount—just £2,123 10s—was reported, "naturally to have startled the whole business community". The same report also stated, "in financial matters wherever there is secrecy there is suspicion, and though Mr. Fink has set a good example to other 'compounders' in openly avowing his embarrassment, a more detailed schedule of his assets and liabilities would have strengthened his position and that of his creditors."

The lack of scrutiny allowed some latitude for debtors to omit from consideration certain assets that they held personally, or to shift assets to the names of relatives or associates. Once the certificate discharging the debt had been issued, the ex-debtors were free to rebuild their fortunes, and some, including Fink, his brother Theodore, and W.L. Baillieu, later did just that.

The secrecy over details of debts and assets also suited some of the creditors, particularly banks who had a large exposure, via loans to Fink. The banks' true exposures would not emerge, until some banks began to fail during 1893. At the time of Fink's 'secret composition', it was not known that there was in fact another £310,000 owed by Fink to the City Bank of Melbourne. The loan was helpfully written off by that bank, probably to prevent it becoming known that the bank itself was, by then, hopelessly insolvent.

=== Winding up companies ===
The Companies Act, as it existed at the time, imposed few constraints on the voluntary liquidation of a company. While shareholders had nominal control of the process, the liquidators in a voluntary winding up could be officers or directors of the company, and often were. Such company officers and directors of failed companies had a conflict of interest, in that they could use their role as liquidators to conceal aspects of the company's affairs that revealed them as culpable or could otherwise attract criticism. At the end of the voluntary liquidation, the liquidator was allowed to destroy all company records. It was a process open to abuse, during the flood of liquidations that followed the peak of the land boom.

Many of the companies were relatively new and shares were only partly paid. Liabilities for unpaid calls on shares, transfers to dummies. Another issue was that although a company may hold the title to land or other property, those 'assets' may have been mortgaged to some other entity.

Given the complexity of Fink's financial holdings, the liquidation of his main financial vehicle, Mercantile Finance and Agency would take some years to achieve.

=== Mercantile Finance ===
==== Relationship to Fink ====
Fink was, by February 1892, no longer a major shareholder of Mercantile Finance, but two companies which he had set up were. The three largest shareholdings—bearing legal responsibility to pay, if necessary, calls of £3 per share on 27,000, 14,424, and 17,590 shares respectively—were Mortgage Debenture Corporation Limited, Mercantile Investment Trust of Australia Limited (already in liquidation by that time), and a person by the name of Niels Jensen—occupation "messenger"—probably a 'dummy owner' for someone else. Fink held only 1,066 shares, and had distanced himself effectively, from personal financial impact, should Mercantile Finance collapse.

==== Liquidation ====
What had been Fink's principal company, Mercantile Finance, suspended payment, in July 1893. The directors, immediately after suspending payment, recommended the company be liquidated. The chairman of Mercantile Finance, John Montgomery Templeton, became one of its liquidators.

Damage done to financial institutions that had accepted guarantees, from Mercantile Finance—as a security for loans to other parties—also began to become apparent.

==== Revelations of questionable conduct ====
In September 1894, the liquidators of Mercantile Finance reported their findings. Among other things they noted, that Fink (a director) and John McAlister Howden (as manager) had operated a partnership outside the company's business—"which was opposed to the fundamental principle that no director of a public company should have private business relations with the manager"—and that both had received favourable treatment, including advances to them without adequate security. Their report noted "the dominant influence alleged to have been exercised by Mr. B. J. Fink in the management of the company, and the use to which it was occasionally put, the liquidators find that especially favourable rates for guarantees in favour of that gentleman."

In summarising the reasons for the company's failure the liquidators report stated, "The immediate causes of the suspension of the company appear to have been, first the financial crisis of December 1891; second, the crisis of March and April 1893; third, the failure of a large portion of shareholders to pay the calls made by directors; but the main causes were the extravagantly large advances made and the guarantees issued, both without sufficient security, during 1887 and 1888."

In 1888, Mercantile Finance had sought to raise £125,000 of new capital in £1 new shares, at a premium of £625,000, totalling to £750,000. Later, a liquidator's report (1894) noted that the number of on-market Mercantile Finance share transactions, in the 37 days preceding the share issue, was actually greater than the number of transactions in the previous 37 months. Moreover, most of the share purchases were in the names of officers and clerks of Mercantile Finance, which were later found to have been directed by either Benjamin Fink or John Howden. The liquidator was in no doubt that the transactions drew other unsuspecting investors to follow the apparent trend. The liquidator was unable to find definitive proof of a share market manipulation, but also noted that that the issue price was three times greater than could be justified by the company's balance sheet, and that "the issue at that price would have been impossible but for the sudden extraordinary rise in the Stock Exchange prices". Further, not all the shares were issued against payments funded by purchasers; some of the new shares were paid by advances to purchasers, from the Mercantile Finance itself, which were not repaid, amounting to around £250,000.

The liquidators report also found that Mercantile Finance had made a loan of £90,000 to Benjamin Fink, which he paid to Australian City and Suburban Investment and Banking Company for 90,000 shares (of £2 shares paid to £1) that he was obliged to take up as the underwriter of its initial share issue, in 1888. The shares concerned were lodged as the security for the loan. Moreover, while the liquidator found this transaction "objectionable"—for Fink to make while chairman of Mercantile Finance—there was actually an agreement, between the two companies, that Mercantile Finance would make advances to the underwriters, of Australian City and Suburban Investment and Banking Company, for such a purpose. Thus a personal obligation of Fink (as underwriter) had been transferred effectively, to Mercantile Finance, as had the risk of future downward price movement of the shares.

==== The outcome ====
Mercantile Finance's creditors did not see any of their money, until the end of 1894, when they received the first dividend of one shilling in the pound. It was stated unequivocally, in August 1895, "that there was, unfortunately, no hope for the shareholders in the liquidation of the company". The investments of the shareholders in the company had been wiped out, as creditors had preference. Worse, shareholders were liable to pay calls on their worthless shares.

It took until April 1900 for the liquidation to be completed. By then, £166,372 2s. 2d. had been received from calls on the company's shares and £38,012 12s. 3d. from asset sales. After deducting the cost of the liquidation and other charges, the seven dividends to creditors totalled £179,509 12s. 5d. Creditors had been paid 3s. 4d. in the pound, or more precisely 3s. and 3 49/50d.

=== Revelations relating to the City of Melbourne Bank failure ===
Fink was named in revelations concerning the failure of the City of Melbourne Bank. However, Fink was also on the receiving end of the bank's own questionable behaviour (refer to Wallach & Co. below).

=== Later years of the McCracken City Brewery Company ===
Many years after the fact, in 1897, more about the McCracken City Brewery Company debentures was revealed by Alex McCracken. The company—already under control of Fink—had in fact sold all its debentures to Fink's company, Mercantile Finance, Trustees, and Agency Company Limited, for £500,000—presumably reduced, after deducting expenses and commissions to £477,000, the value of net proceeds indicated in 1889—and it was that company which sold them to London investors. At the time, the placement of the debentures into the London market had been reported to be by two Australian banks, and there had been no mention of Fink's involvement.

In the same year, 1889, Fink bad been having trouble raising funds in London for Mercantile Finance and other Fink-controlled companies. McCracken's debentures had been more acceptable to London investors, as the debenture raising was a success. With the highly inflated valuation of the McCracken City Brewery company at its float, the share and debenture purchases had provided a quick cash windfall to Fink. The brewery operation had been left burdened with servicing the debenture interest payments and paying dividends to shareholders. It was a masterful piece of financing, at least on the part of Fink.

Reportedly, Fink owed £250,000— but the actual amount was not absolutely clear—to the shareholders of the original McCracken company, the amount which he was to pay for the right of floating the company. It is known however that, at the time of his 'secret composition, Fink still owed £113,000 to Peter McCracken, a large proportion of which was unsecured. It is said that Peter McCracken died, in 1892, not knowing if be had made his family's fortune, or lost it. Members of the extended McCracken family held mortgages over various properties controlled by Fink; 'The Grange' and Gresham's Buildings, as two examples. It seems the McCracken family collected at least some value from Fink, but in the end by repossessing mortgaged Fink family properties.

Fink held shares in the company. Those did not appear within the unencumbered assets in his 'secret composition', so the McCracken shares were most probably either pledged as security to creditors or had been sold already. He did, however, remain liable for some later share calls.

McCracken City Brewery Company lingered on but desperately needed a capital reconstruction. It was one of six Melbourne breweries that amalgamated, in 1906. A portion of the new shares of the amalgamated group were shared between former shareholders and debenture holders of the McCracken City Brewery Company. The newly combined entity had an authorised capital of £1,000,000. The McCracken City Brewery Company shareholders would receive new shares to the value of £41,625, and the debenture holders new shares to the value of £143,375. The new entity became Cartlon and United Breweries.

The amalgamation did not include freehold properties and hotels owned by the McCracken's City Brewery Company, which were placed into a trust, Melbourne City Properties Trust, along with a number of ordinary and preference shares in companies of the Carlton & United Breweries group. The profits were apportioned between former McCracken debenture holders. The trust existed until 1938, when it was acquired by a new English company, Melbourne and General Investment Trust Ltd.

The Austral Otis works, on the corner of what was then Hanna St (now Kingsway) and Kavanagh St, South Melbourne, c.1898.

=== Austral Otis Elevators and Engineering Limited ===
Fink was no longer the chairman of Austral Otis Elevators and Engineering Limited, by October 1892. The company survived the economic turmoil of 1892-1893, and was renamed, Austral Otis Engineering Company Limited, in 1893. The company continued to use that name until 1952. An American company, Food Machinery & Chemical Corporation, acquired a controlling interest in the business, on 30 July 1948.

=== Retailers ===
==== W.H. Rocke & Co. and Maurice Aron & Co. ====
In March 1893, not long before the banking crisis of May 1893, creditors of the two companies sought to have them compulsorily wound up. The Bank of Victoria petitioned for the winding up of Maurice Aron & Co., over a debt of £26,647 7s. 1d., with the company's total indebtedness to all creditors estimated at £50,000. The Commercial Bank petitioned for the winding up of W.H. Rocke & Co., over a debt of .£27,934 8s. 1d., with the company's total indebtedness to all creditors estimated at £160,000.

The furniture business of W.H. Rocke survived under various owners, until early 1932, when the then proprietary company was bought by the Myer Emporium.

==== Wallach & Co. ====
It emerged that Fink was using Wallach & Co, as a source of funding for his various ventures, as his financial troubles increased.

Fifteen months before Fink's 'secret composition', Wallach & Co Ltd had borrowed heavily from the Australian Joint Stock Bank of Sydney, secured only by Fink's personal guarantee. Fink was also borrowing from Wallach & Co, and so the loan funds from the bank effectively went to Fink.

In the NSW Parliament, Richard Sleath alleged that, in July 1892, the title of the Lakelands Estate, on the western foreshore of Lake Illawarra, had been transferred to Benjamin Fink, at a price of 10 shillings. He also alleged that Fink had then mortgaged the land to Wallachs, for £8,320. This was around the time that Fink's massive financial problems were beginning to become apparent. After Fink's failure, the land—apparently no longer owned by Fink or Wallachs—would be sold through various company structures, in some questionable related-party land dealings—each time at a higher valuation— but by then Fink was no longer be involved.

From around March 1894, Wallach & Co. was effectively controlled by various officers of the City of Melbourne Bank, who had manoeuvred the absent Benjamin Fink out of his role as managing director, by making a share call that he could not pay. To do that the bank had acquired shares from Maurice Aron and funded the call on his shares by an advance of £5.000. The indebted business was losing money.

The liquidators of the City of Melbourne Bank noted, in 1896, that the articles of association of Wallachs, allowed its directors to draw £2,000 per annum each, but found that between May 1892 and September 1894, Benjamin Fink had drawn £22,500 and Maurice Aron £10,400.

The Commercial Bank petitioned for the winding up of Wallachs, over a debt of .£27,934 8s. 1d., with the company's total indebtedness to all creditors estimated at £160,000. It was the end of Fink's furniture monopoly.

Wallach & Co. was liquidated, but the business was sold off by the liquidators. In 1896, its stock was sold off by the new owners. By 1905, the business was again controlled by members of Fink's family.

==== George & George ====
Although George and George Limited's business was affected by the economic depression, it remained profitable, and was to survive for many decades. David Jones then took over Georges in 1981. The store was closed on 5 October 1995. For all those years, it occupied the building that Fink had expended when relocating the business there.

== Later life (1893 - 1909) ==
=== Exile and visits to Melbourne ===
Fink was still in Melbourne, in late December 1893, but his wife, Catherin Fink, lost the title to their last Melbourne home, 'the Grange', at the end of that month. Upon instruction from Catherine Fink, an auction sale of the movable property from 'The Grange' was held on 15 and 16 January 1894. Fink, his wife, and their two children left Melbourne, aboard the Ville de la Ciotat, bound for Marsailles, on 31 January 1894.

A report, from the time that the Fink family left Melbourne, stated, "Mr. Fink intends to take six months rest, recommended by his medical adviser." However, George Meudell later wrote, in his 1929 book, The Pleasant Career of a Spendthrift, that Fink had left Melbourne, after he "was threatened with assassination". If so, it was not an unreasonable decision; after James Munro returned to Melbourne, in 1893, Munro was attacked by a labourer who had lost his life savings of £100 in the crash.

Benjamin Fink and his family made their permanent residence in England thereafter. They had a London residence at 6 Aubrey Road, in West London, and a country residence, 'Oakhurst Court', South Godstone, Surrey, which is now a nursing home.

Some sources say that Benjamin Fink, never returned to Australia, but that it is incorrect. It is recorded that he was in Victoria, during parts of 1896 and 1897, as were his wife and daughter. There are also reports of another visit, during much of 1899 and 1900, on which he was also accompanied by his wife and daughter.

Moreover, Fink retained various directorship positions in Australian companies. He was chairman of the company operating the Federal Coffee Palace, in Melbourne, until at least December 1900, when he chaired an extraordinary shareholders meeting, in Melbourne. He was succeeded in that role by his brother, Wolfe Fink, by 1902.

Fink was back in London in February 1901, and he never visited Australia again. For the last 12 years of his life, from around 1897, he was in poor health due to diabetes.

Fink's son was in Melbourne in 1905. Fink's two children, accompanied by their cousin, Miss Brandt, made a visit to New Zealand in 1906, which included walking from Lake Te Anau to Milford Sound, a distance of 64 miles, before visiting Melbourne. Fink's wife, Catherine, also visited Melbourne to look after various property interests.

=== Legal battles ===
==== Legal actions over Fink's composition ====
Not all of Benjamin Fink's creditors were satisfied with his 'secret composition'.

In September 1892, the manager of the Union Bank of Australia, "attorney under power for the liquidators of the Bank of South Australia", objected to Fink's 'secret composition', on the grounds that "the resolutions were not passed for the benefit of the creditors of B.J, Fink, but for the benefit of Fink himself, and out of a friendly consideration for him." They also objected to the validity of a number of debts, some of these to companies closely-related to Fink himself.

The Widows Fund Life Assurance Society, sought to have the composition set aside by the Insolvency Court, in late 1892. The action was taken, "with a view of ultimately setting aside the composition and bringing about liquidation by arrangement or an insolvency in order that the whole of the assets of Fink's estate may be available for distribution among his creditors." There was a view that Fink had managed to retain effective control of some valuable assets, while escaping his debts via his 'secret composition'.

In the end, out of court settlements were made, effectively preserving the 'secret composition' and the halfpenny-in-the-pound settlement of 1892.

In May 1894, the Supreme Court upheld an appeal by Fink against an earlier judgement of the Insolvency Court, in February 1894—by which time Fink was no longer residing in Melbourne—that would have had the effect of upsetting the finality of his 'secret composition'.

==== Legal action during the liquidation of Mercantile Finance ====
In May 1895, the liquidators of Mercantile Finance, who had sued Fink's wife, Catherine Fink, for £2,707 owed for share calls, agreed to accept just £358 15s., as a final settlement.

==== 'The Grange' ====
In March 1891, Fink's wife, Catherine, took a personal loan from James Robertson, of £17,000 principal at 7% interest per annum, secured by a mortgage over Fink's last home in Melbourne, 'The Grange'. The repayment of the principal was due in March 1894. She defaulted on an interest payment, after September 1892—around the time of Benjamin Fink's creditors' meeting. Under the terms of the loan agreement, Robertson was then able to demand immediate full repayment of the principal, which he did. When that repayment did not occur, Robertson foreclosed on 'The Grange', obtained title to it, on 30 December 1893, and then moved in. Robertson was related by marriage to the McCracken family, and he had been one of the original partners in the McCracken brewery, until 1861. It is said that he derived some personal satisfaction in taking possession of 'The Grange' from the Fink family. He died there, in 1895.

Later, three men—Malcolm Robertson, Coiler McCracken, and Alexander Oliver—representing heirs of James Robertson, insisted on repayment of the loan principal, with interest from September 1892 up to the time of the writ—in total £28,754—despite the earlier foreclosure on 'The Grange'. The legal dispute over the matter continued into 1907. It eventually reached the High Court, where Catherine Fink won on appeal. The building itself only existed for less than another five years. It was badly damaged in a fire, in January 1912, then demolished. The eight acres of land, upon which it had stood, were added to surrounding Kings Domain parkland.

=== Fink's Bankruptcy in London (1902-1903) ===
Fink had not been made bankrupt in Melbourne, opting to take the path of a 'secret composition'. However, he had existing commitments that continued to generate liabilities, such as share calls. A receiving order for £135,288, was made in November 1902. Of that amount, £126,000 was for calls on McCracken's Brewery shares. Claiming to have no assets, other than £3,000 to £4,000 that he owed to his wife, Fink was made bankrupt. In late January 1903, his bankruptcy was discharged after paying a 'nominal sum', of £100.

=== Recovery of the Fink family fortune ===
Fink had been able to transfer a large amount of land in Melbourne's Western Suburbs into his wife's name, in 1892. The land therefore was not included in Fink's assets at the time of his 'secret composition'. Catherine Fink continued to subdivide and sell off that land, in conjunction with Thomas Bent. Bent had not been made insolvent during the aftermath of the land boom. He fought hard to dispute various claims for payment made against him; Bent was also said to have paid only such of his bills as he needed to avoid insolvency. The land company named after him, Thomas Bent Land Company, seems to have become effectively dormant after 1893. However, he had both avoided insolvency, and remained in business.

There were apparently other assets in Catherine's name, such 'the Grange'. Just before Fink and his family had moved to London, his wife sold the furniture and other contents of his last Melbourne home, 'The Grange'. The sale, including everything from pianos and a cabinet organ to horses and a milking cow, was by auction, in January 1894. The house itself had been repossessed, by James Robertson, on 30 December 1893 (refer also to 'The Grange' above).

Fink continued to accumulate investments, apparently in his own name. In May 1897, a report appeared stating that, "Mr. B. J. Fink is now perhaps the wealthiest Australian in England. His dividends from the Lord Nelson mine alone amount to £1800 a year, not to speak of dividends from Broken Hill stock, Silverton Tramways, and other 'unconsidered trifles' which he bad picked up 'dirt cheap.' Mr. Fink's wealth is estimated at half a million sterling." Possibly, that was an exaggerated report, but Fink and his immediate family were still wealthy.

Benjamin Fink, had escaped bankruptcy via a 'secret composition' in October 1892. He was made bankrupt, in London, in 1902. Fink's formal bankruptcy effectively precluded any later roles as a company director. Much of the Fink family's remaining wealth was held in the names of other family members.

The collapse in Melbourne property values following the crash presented an opportunity to buy properties back from mortgagees. Catherine Fink was able to repurchase two valuable properties, on which Fink previously had defaulted; in 1895, a fifty-year lease over the Ballarat Star Hotel building, and in 1899, the freehold of Fink's Buildings.

In 1898, Catherine and her daughter Winifred were shareholders in the Mount Lyell Mining and Railway Company. A share of the Wallach Brothers business also remained under family control in 1905. In October of that year, "Harold Neston [sic] Fink and Jacob Brandt, trading as Wallachs"—Harold Nestor Fink was Fink's son and Jacob Brandt, a nephew—sold the stock in trade from their Elizabeth Street warehouse, with an estimated value of £58,000.

Catherine Fink continued to manage the family's fortune after Fink's death in 1909. One observer noted, at the time of Fink's death, that, "Men say that Mrs. Benjamin Fink, a tall, handsome woman, was the brainy power behind the throne. She is credited with a genius for finance." It is noteworthy that the trajectory of Fink's stellar success began in 1874, the same year that he married Catherine.

=== Fink's reputation ===
Before the crash, Fink had been portrayed as either a financial genius or as someone who had achieved much by sheer application and hard work; many had either followed his lead in investments or accepted as security his personal guarantees of loans. His entry in Australian Representative Men (1887) stated, "The mere mention of his name in connection with any company is considered ample guarantees of its bona fides".

Before it all came crashing down, Fink was labelled 'The Prince of Speculators', and widely believed to possess immense wealth. He was, for a time, in control of numerous companies and properties, even if it was later revealed—due to falling asset prices—that control rested up on vast amounts of effectively unsecured debt and dubious guarantees. In the aftermath of the crash, Benjamin Fink suffered a badly damaged reputation.

Benjamin Fink recovered quickly and prospered, in the years following the crash, but he was not the only land boomer to do so.

Fink took advantage of the lax commercial, banking and insolvency laws of his day, as did many others. While some other land boom figures faced prosecution over their activities during the boom, Fink was never accused of breaking the law. Neither is there evidence that Fink used his position as member of the Legislative Assembly to advance his interests. However, Benjamin Fink's public reputation, almost alone of the land boomers, never recovered.

Cartoon from The Bulletin, April 1890, showing a character with exaggerated facial features of kinds that are usually understood to be antisemitic stereotypes of Jews. The dialogue is about lending money and trustworthiness.

There were Jews among the 'land boomers'—Fink himself, Fink's brother Theodore, and Benjamin Benjamin—but the land boom madness had been so widespread that the involvement of some Jews in it was not particularly noteworthy. However, Fink was subject to some anti-Semitic stereotyping, in a way that other Jews—including Fink's brother, Theodore—apparently were not.

A derogatory antisemitic stereotype of Jews, dating from at latest medieval times, is avarice; that Jews are "greedy and unscrupulous in pursuit of profit". Theodore Fink was said to have resented "the vulgar error of equating success for those of Jewish origin with the mere making of money". Benjamin Fink has been portrayed as being obsessed with making money. He was known for a black bag, which he habitually carried in public and even inside the Victorian Legislative Assembly. Writing in 1929, George Meudell recalled that "Fink carried a black bag in which were mining scrip, Bank shares, Crown grants, bond warrants, promissory notes, debentures, Bank deposit receipts, mortgages, an olla podrida of saleable things," and that Fink was always seemed ready to transact, at short notice, should an opportunity arise. Meudell also said of Fink that his, "knowledge of sound finance was primary [sic] with an Asiatic tendency," straying into another antisemitic stereotype; the Jews as Oriental foreigners within Western societies.

Instances of antisemitic stereotyping of Fink do exist in newspaper reports and journals of the time, but are both few and seemingly confined to commentary and opinion pieces rather than factual news reports. Some cartoon portrayals of apparently shady characters, within journals dating from around the land boom era, include the exaggerated facial features associated with stereotypes of Jews. Some such cartoons also include characters, who are identifiable as Jewish, due to being identified with Jewish-sounding names. Since relatively few Jews were land boomers, some of those cartoons are possibly referencing Benjamin Fink, if not directly by name. However, antisemitism alone does not account for Fink's diminished reputation.

In the Melbourne of the late 19th Century, the relatively small, largely Anglo-Jewish community, to which the extended Fink family belonged, was well integrated with and well connected to the wider business and civic community—the other leading lights of which were mainly Presbyterian or Anglican—and antisemitism was not prevalent.

One of the most consistent and courageous critics of the machinations of the land boomers was the proprietor and editor of the weekly magazine, Table Talk, Maurice Brodsky (1847–1919). The accusations that were made in Table Talk were backed by unattributed but detailed financial numbers—later shown to be astoundingly accurate—and nobody sued for libel over any of the disclosures. Brodsky was himself Jewish and was related to the Fink family, through his marriage to Florence Leon. Her brother, barrister Samuel Leon (1849–1933), was married to Fink's younger sister Theodora Fink (1851–1927). Samuel and Theodora were also cousins, on Fink's mother's side. Table Talk did not spare Benjamin Fink or his company Mercantile Finance. Brodsky's work led to a falling out with Theodore Fink, to whom he had been close.

Table Talk provided this perceptive view of Fink's financial failure, "The lesson to be learned by Mr. Fink's failure is that by using capital as a margin for financing, nothing but the most extreme caution will prevent the operation becoming a mere gamble." Moreover, Table Talk also provided an explanation, "If the prices which Mr. Fink bought at had been maintained he would have been able to complete every purchase, and the income from the properties would soon have made him a millionaire. There is no doubt, however, that Mr. Fink miscalculated the strength of the boom and overestimated the permanent growth of the city of Melbourne." Fink had grand ambitions but pushed gearing to its limit, and then had been caught out by falling asset values.

The damage to Fink's reputation really only came after the peak of the land boom, during the aftermath of the crash; revelations of his complex financial arrangements, the losses of depositors funds, the collateral damage caused to banks and other lenders—particularly due to the loan guarantees that were worthless—his 'secret composition'—resulting in the nickname 'Farthing Fink'—a not undeserved suspicion that he had intentionally hidden some assets from his creditors reach, revelations of his alleged influence over management of Mercantile Finance and the City of Melbourne Bank, and a perception of his having left Melbourne and his debts behind, while effectively later recovering much of his fortune. Fink's biographer Michael Cannon wrote of Fink, "His manipulations when the boom collapsed disfigured an otherwise productive career."

Fink was not in Australia, in September 1894, when credible and damaging allegations of questionable conduct were made against him and John McAlister Howden, in the report by the liquidators of Mercantile Finance. His huge debts to the failed City of Melbourne Bank, and the favourable treatment Fink had received from that bank, became known, in 1896. It is apparent that he neither commented publicly upon these allegations, nor otherwise defended himself. His silence perhaps allowed some other participants—particularly fellow directors liquidating his many companies—to diminish their own parts in the debacle, leaving Fink as an emblematic villain of the land boom era.

Catherine Fink's apparent personal wealth was treated with some scepticism. The columnist, Maude Wheeler, writing in Truth, in July 1901, jested, "B. J. Farthing Fink is in London, and doing well, just as fat as ever, and much younger looking than in the days before he went bung for half a million. It is a popular joke that B.J.F.F. is afflicted with paralysis in his right hand, and so his charming wife signs everything for him. Of course all the misgotten boodle is in the lady's name."

Fink's long absences from Melbourne—he did not visit Melbourne, after 1900—and his relatively early death, in 1909, allowed public memory of him to fade. In later years, Catherine Fink was sometimes referred to as 'Theodore Fink's sister-in-law', not as 'B.J. Fink's widow'.

George Meudell (1860—1936), was the assistant manager of Mercantile Finance Guarantee and Agency Company, deputy to John McAllister Howden, and he had worked closely with Fink. He gave this assessment of Fink in his 1929 book, The Pleasant Career of a Spendthrift, "B. J. Fink was messianic in his conceit and made paper millions with the same ease as a schoolboy builds Meccano bridges, and the millions fell to pieces as simply."

However, in the same book, Meudell wrote, "B. J. Fink was a subtle, astute man of business of more than ordinary capacity, as sagacious as he was audacious, a man of vivid imagination and of restless energy in carrying out his schemes. He should have stopped outside the boom vortex and when the smash came he might have gathered in four or five million pounds' worth of goods and properties." He also wrote that, "Of all the financiers I have met in Australia or abroad, B.J. Fink was easily the cleverest of them all. He had no equal in Australia in la haute finance."

== Death and family ==
Benjamin Fink died on 17 September 1909, at his London home. Coincidentally, he died on the same day as another 'land boomer', Thomas Bent. Of the main Melbourne newspaper publishers—The Age, The Argus and The Herald—only the Herald and its associated newspapers carried news of his death. Fink was cremated, and his ashes were later interred at Melbourne General Cemetery, in March 1910.

He left an estate worth £250,000. Fink died intestate. As he had endured a lengthy chronic illness, that was most probably intentional; it would have triggered a distribution of his assets under the 'rules of intestacy', as those rules were at the time. Specifically, any real estate that he owned would have passed to his son, not to his wife and daughter.

Fink was survived by his wife Catherine, a son, Harold Nestor Fink, and a daughter Winifred. Harold studied at Cambridge, he obtained a BA, in 1898, and continued studying, becoming a medical practitioner. He died relatively young, at age 36, in 1912, at Port Said, en route to Melbourne. Winifred, reputedly a great beauty, married Paymaster Rear-Admiral Frederick Arthur Frith Banbury (1874-1951), in 1911.

== Catherine Fink ==
Catherine Fink was a wealthy woman in her own right. Aside from the various assets transferred to her name by Fink and the commercial buildings that she purchased, in 1890s, she is believed to have held title over three substantial terrace houses, in East Melbourne, that were built for her father, Hirsch Fink. She was also her father's heir.

At the time of Hirsch Fink's death, in 1890, Catherine was his only surviving child. In his will, Hirsch Fink made certain bequests, with the residual of his estate being given as a life interest to his wife, Amelia. The reversionary interest passed, upon Amelia Fink's death, to her daughter Catherine. Hirsch Fink's estate included land, buildings, and shares, some of which were in ventures associated with his son-in-law, Benjamin Fink. Amelia Fink died, aged 97, in June 1910. Catherine Fink donated money to build the B.J.Fink Cottage, at the Old Colonists' Home, Rushall Crescent, North Fitzroy, in 1911.

Harold Nestor Fink died in 1912, and left his mother, Catherine Fink, £35,081 in real estate and £50,331 personally. She donated £100,000 to establish the Harold Fink Memorial Hospital, in memory of her son. Located in a former mansion that Catherine had purchased, at Mayfair, in London, the hospital operated between 1912 and 1935. During the First World War, it treated over 1,300 wounded and disabled officers, with the full cost of their treatment being met by Mrs Fink.

In October 1923, Catherine Fink and her daughter, Winifred Banbury, were the directors of the newly-registered company, Grange Investment Co. Pty. Ltd., with an authorised capital of £30,000 and its registered office in Melbourne. During the Second World War, that family company, subscribed £29,150 to war loans.

In 1912, Catherine Fink was residing at her house in Surrey, but "not long since she was busy about Melbourne dealing with her many propertied interests in the city." She returned to Melbourne to live, around 1928, and died at her home, on Iona Avenue, Toorak, on 11 October 1943, aged 89. Her remains were cremated and her ashes interred in the Melbourne General Cemetery, at the same grave site as her husband's ashes. She died on the same afternoon that Fink's Buildings, which she then owned, was sold to the Commonwealth Bank. Her estate was valued at £114,919—£102,780 being in the form of real estate—and was left to relatives.

== Legacy ==
=== Suburbs, buildings and infrastructure ===
Melbourne's suburbs expanded during the years of the land boom, as property was subdivided for housing. Fink is particularly associated with Preston, Northcote, and Essendon.

The land boom era saw a huge amount of building in Melbourne's CBD. Buildings of this era are characterised by a distinctive Victorian italianate inspired style, known as the 'boom style'. The cumulative effects of the land boom on the physical appearance of Melbourne were captured in the film Marvellous Melbourne made in 1910. It was made around the time that Melbourne had recovered from the 15-year economic slump, begun by the land boom crash and the subsequent banking crisis. By 1905, Melbourne had lost its position as the most populous city in Australia, but its built environment reflected the huge cumulative development that had taken place there in the boom years.

During the period from the 1950s to the 1970s, the elaborate Victorian buildings of the land boom era were seen by many as dated and impractical, and many buildings were demolished. Among the buildings lost were some associated with Fink, either build for him or controlled by him at some stage. Those lost buildings include, Fink's Building (north-eastern corner of Elizabeth and Flinders Streets) and the Federal Coffee Palace (south-western corner of Collins and King Streets). Of the major buildings built for Benjamin Fink in Melbourne, only the Block Arcade remains, in near original form. The building of the former Ballarat Star Hotel—rebuilt for Fink in 1887-1888—still stands at 226-268 Swanston Street & 243-257 Little Bourke Street, Melbourne, but is now repurposed.

Some buildings in Melbourne with a connection to Benjamin Fink

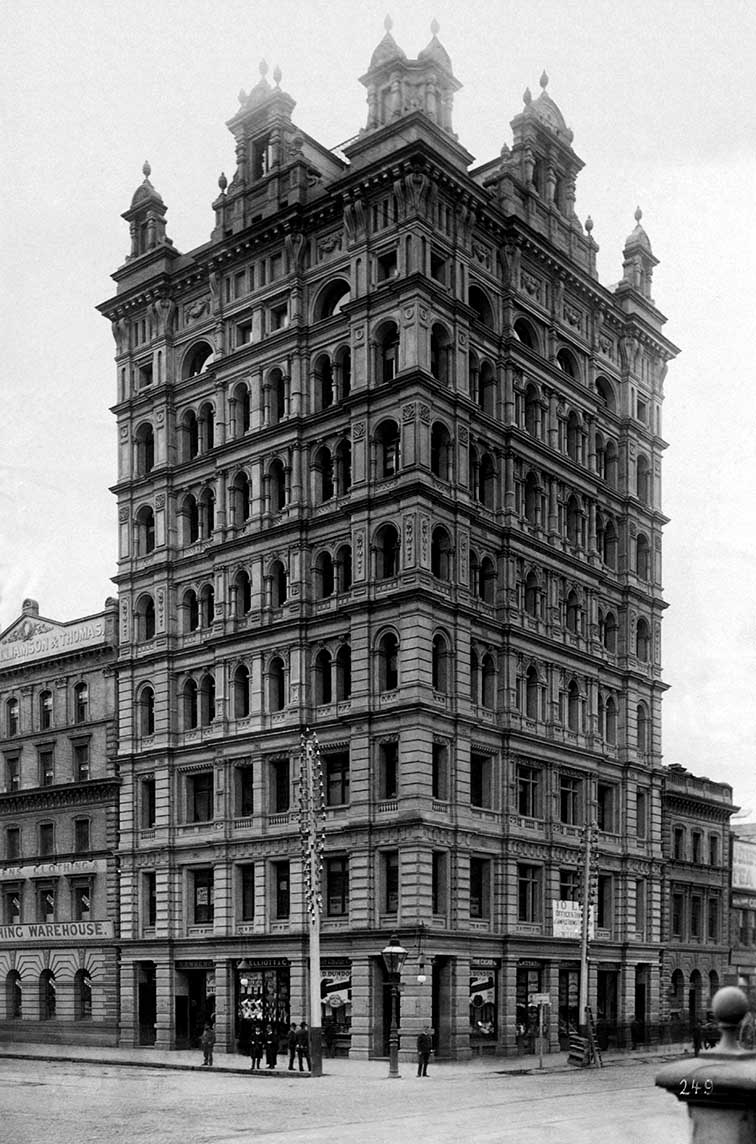
Fink's Buildings, in the 1890s, now gone. It was built for Fink, and later owned by his wife, Catherine Fink.

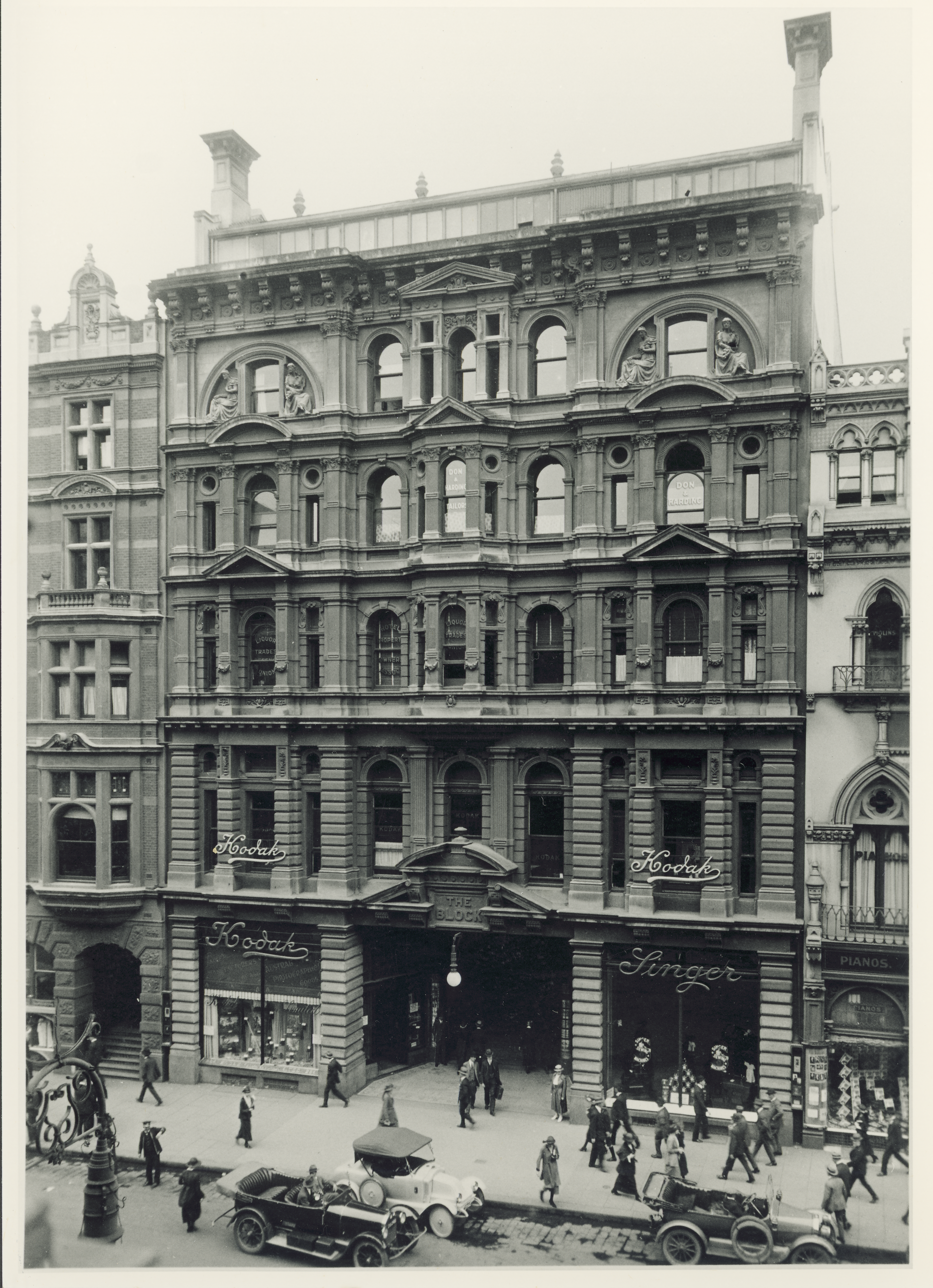
The Block Arcade building, which was built for Fink, shown in the 1930s.

Block Arcade interior (2012)

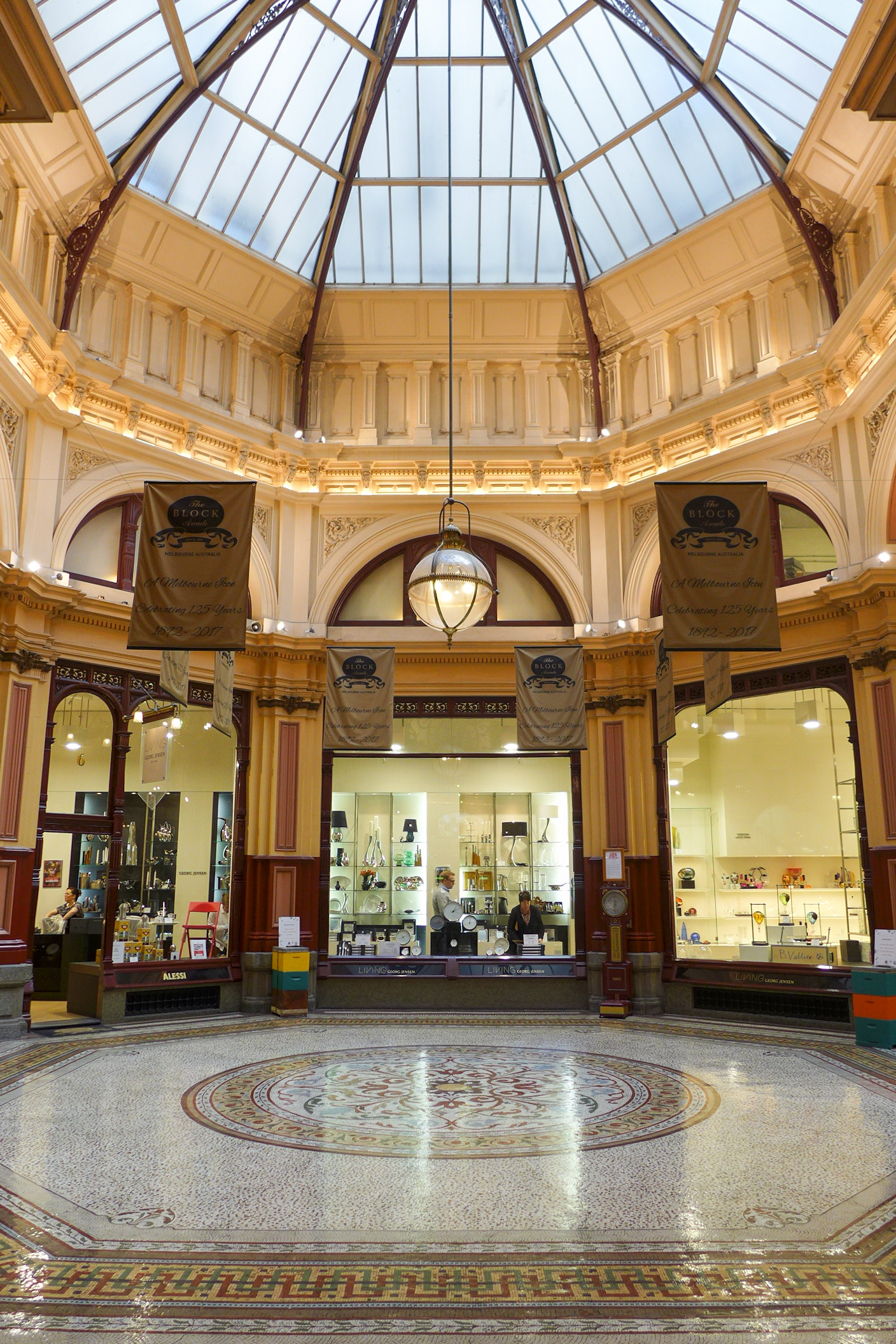
Block Arcade, the central atrium, in 2017. It is said to be modelled after the Galleria Vittorio Emanuele II, but clearly on a smaller scale.

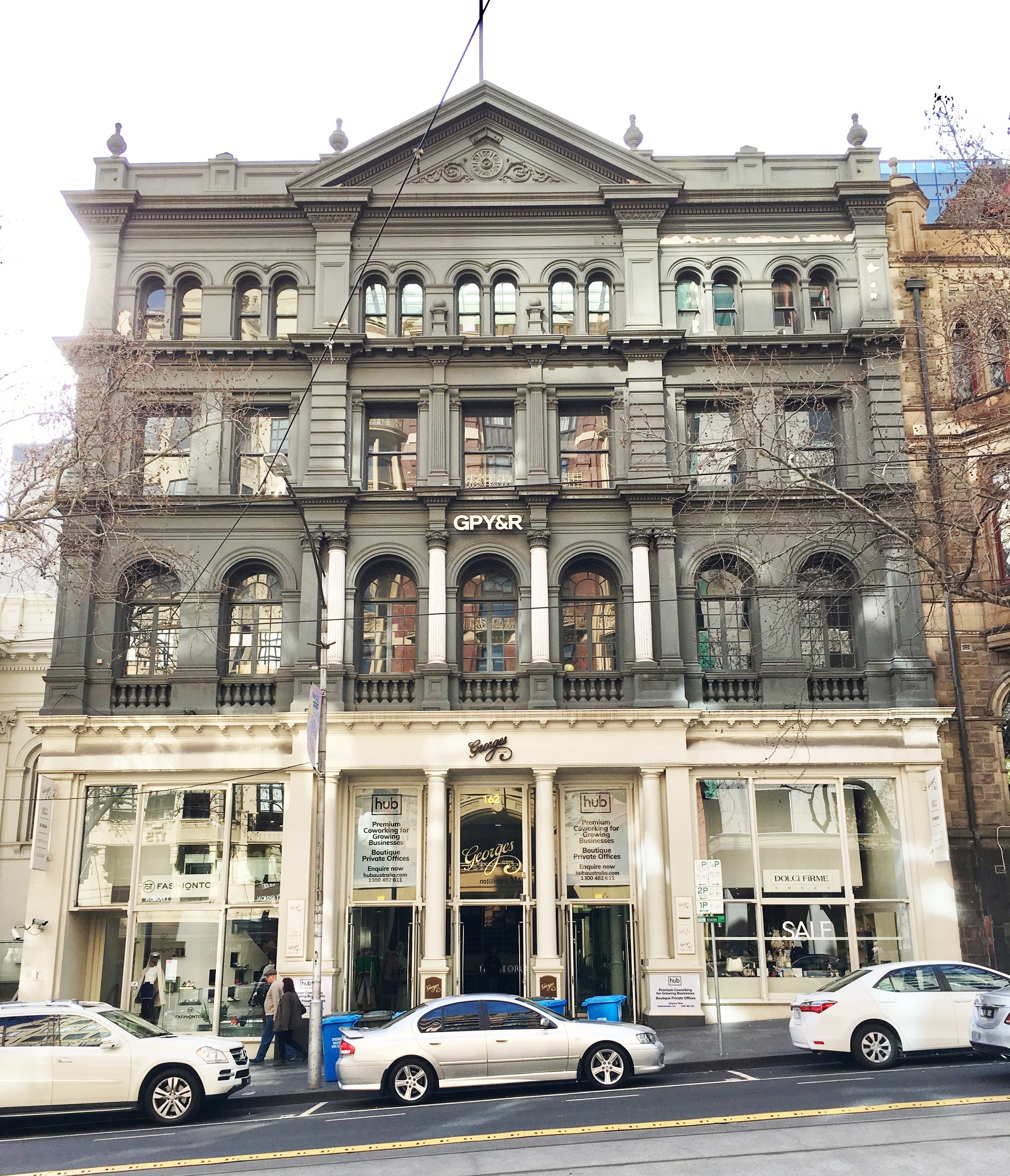
Former Georges department store building. It was extended, by Fink, through to Little Collins Street.

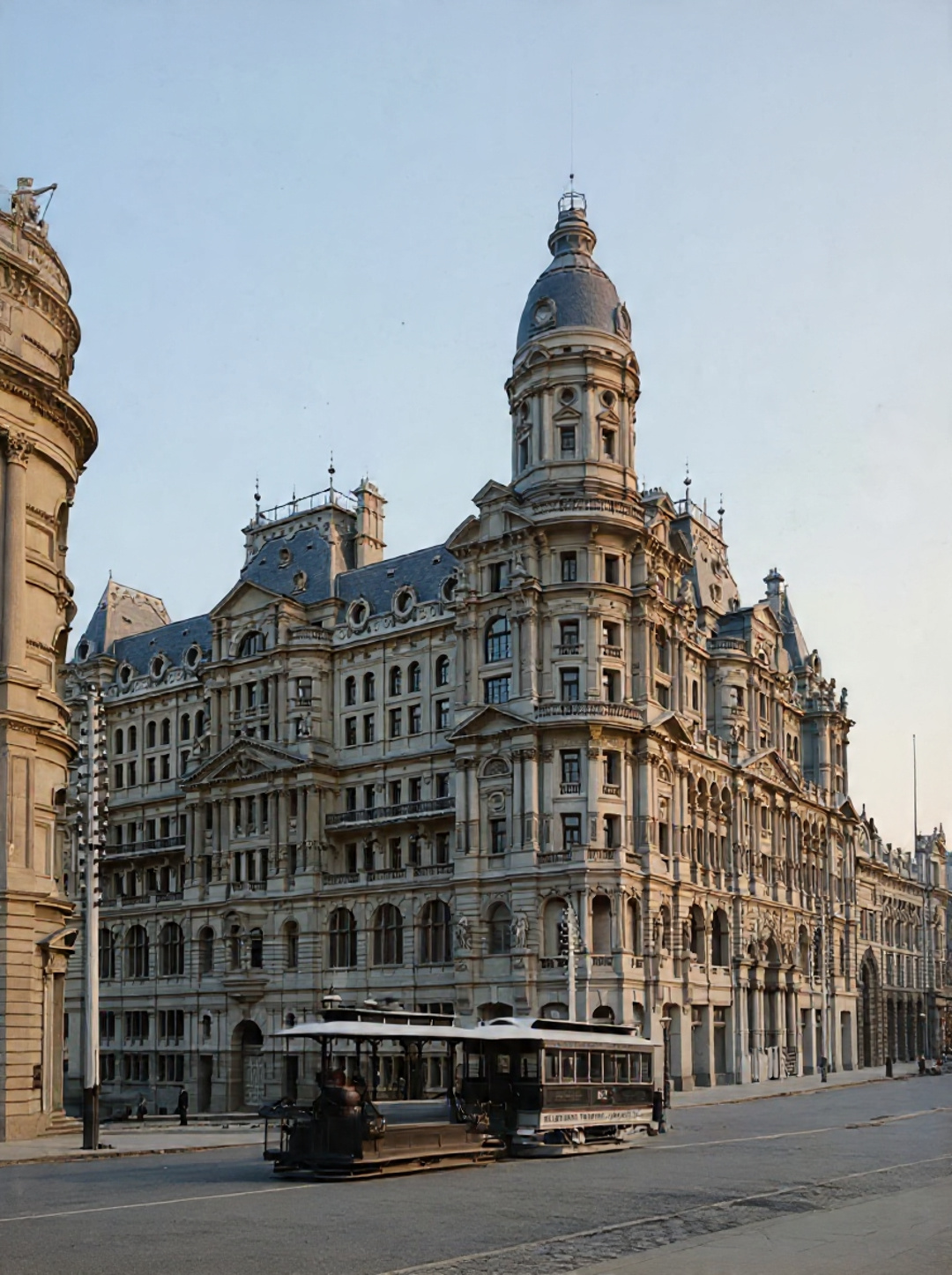
Federal Coffee Palace building, now gone. Fink was the chairman of the company's board of directors.

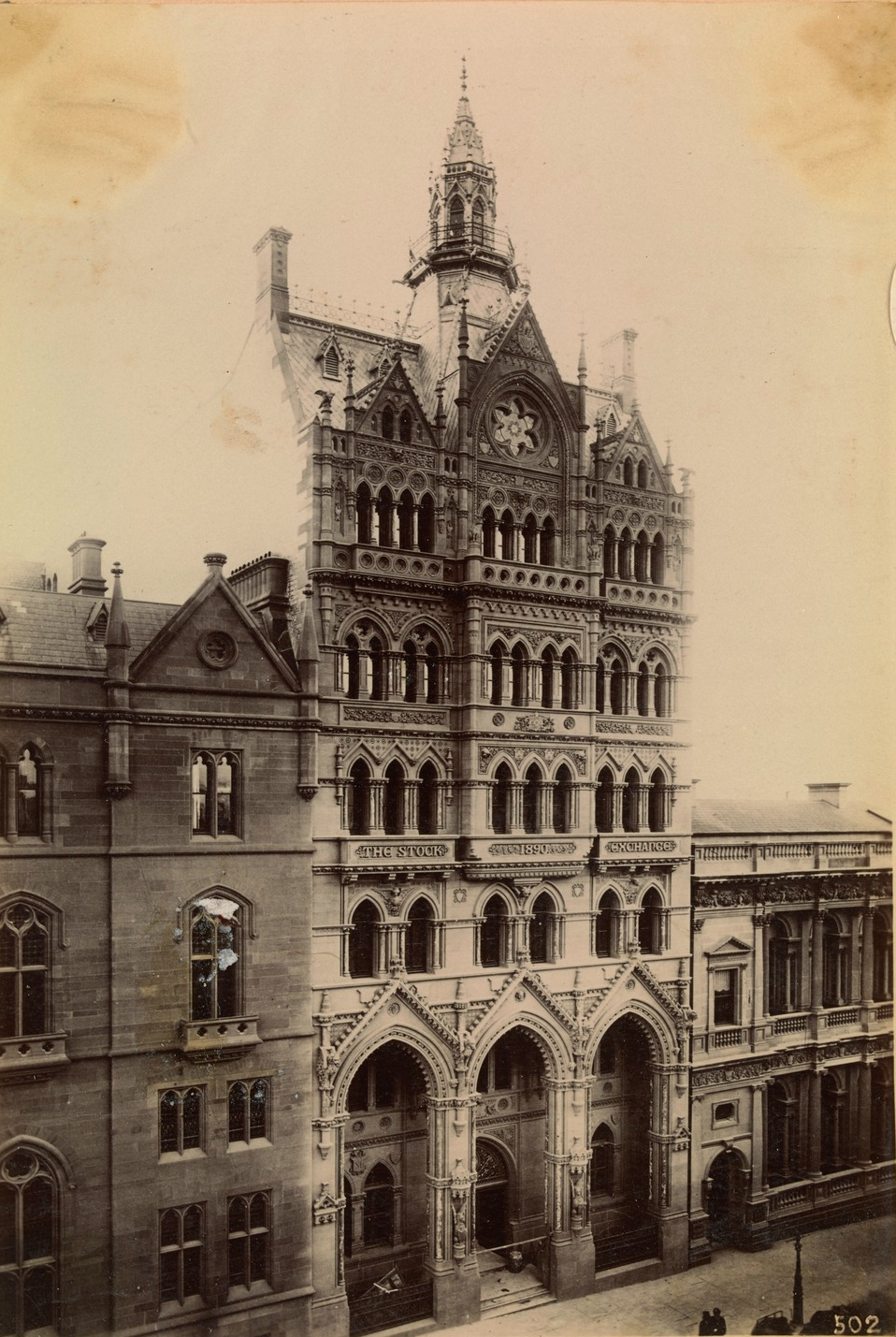
Stock Exchange building, taken c.1890 to c.1892, now part of the ANZ Bank headquarters. Fink persuaded the exchange to build upon his land, making a £50,000 profit from the transaction.

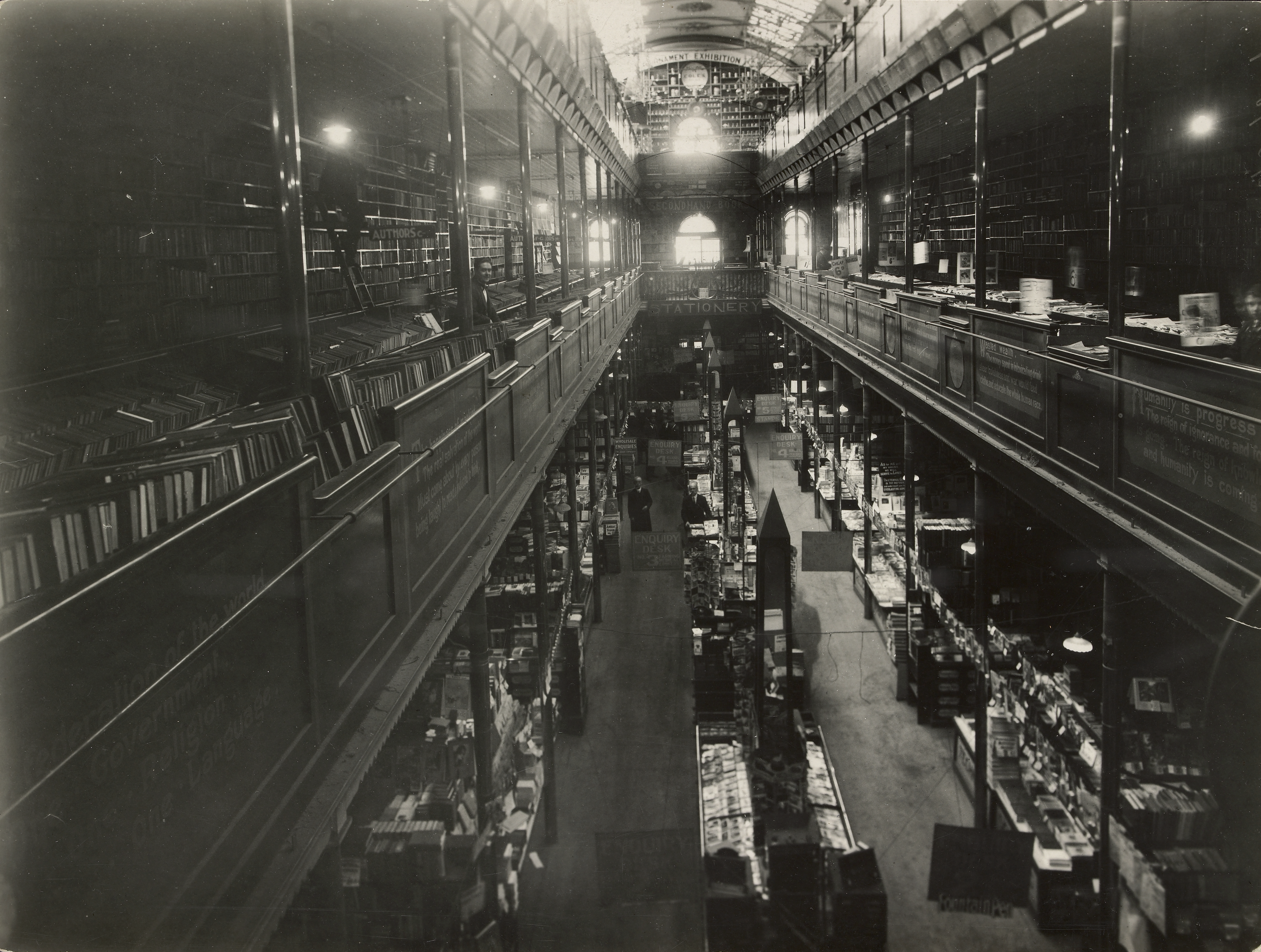
Interior of Cole's Book Arcade, now gone. For a time, it was owned by Fink.

The Clifton Hill to Northcote & Preston Tramway Company Limited ceased operating in 1893. It was losing money. Its equipment was repossessed by the English Scottish and Australian Chartered Bank, as mortgagee, and its roadway reverted to the Borough of Northcote. Its line was reopened and, after various changes of operator, it came under the control of the new MMTB, in 1920. Fink's cable tram line, from Northcote to Clifton Hill, was a part of the last operational cable tram route in Melbourne, which closed in October 1940. It was replaced by a bus service. Later rebuilt as an electrified tramway, which began operation in June 1955, its former route is now the part of route 86.

=== In the literature ===
A chapter on Fink's life is included in Australian Representative Men, edited by T.W.H. Leavitt. It was published, in Melbourne, in 1887. Its publication predates Fink's financial troubles, and it provides a highly-favourable biography—according to Michael Cannon, the book was "10 gns per biography; 3 gns per copy of the book"—up to a time when Fink was at the peak of his influence and wealth. It also contains an image of Fink, which is a rarity.

George Meubell wrote an autobiographical work, The Pleasant Career of a Spendthrift, in which there are three chapters in which Fink figures prominently, along with other 'land boomers' whom Meudell knew. When published in 1929, Meudell's book caused such a reaction that it effectively was withdrawn from sale to the public. J. M. Gillespie—himself a former land boomer, but, by 1929, chairman of the bookseller Robertson & Mullen—ordered that Robertson & Mullen’s bookstores not stock it, and other booksellers were warned of potential legal action if they did. The book continued to be sold privately. A former Australian Prime Minister, Robert Menzies, owned a copy of that suppressed 1929 version.

A later author, Michael Cannon (1929—2022), wrote that there was a view that Meudell's 1929 book was intended as a form of blackmail; that by raising the questionable behaviour of the land boom era, he was seeking to be bought off by those surviving participants whom he mentioned, or their families. Cannon himself spoke with some people who knew Meudell personally, and he concluded that Meudell was trying to set the record straight, before he died. If so, he apparently later changed his mind.

Meudell later heavily revised his book, presenting some of his subjects in a much more sympathetic light. It was republished, as The Pleasant Career of a Spendthrift, and His Later Reflection, in 1936, the year that Meudell died. A number of references to Benjamin Fink were removed in the revised version, seemingly at the request of Fink's brother, Theodore Fink—by then the chairman of Herald and Weekly Times—whom Michael Cannon thought may have actually helped with the rewrite. Also removed was a lengthy list of insolvent land boomers, along with any criticism of W.L. Baillieu.

Fink figures in a book about the land boom and the many prominent Victorians who participated in it, The Land Boomers, by Michael Cannon, published in 1966. The book includes a part titled, 'The Munro-Baillieu-Fink Group', with a chapter devoted to Fink. Even in 1966, over seven decades after the land boom and its disastrous crash, publication of the book brought threats of legal action—to suppress its publication or for libel—which if anything just served to boost its sales. Michael Cannon wrote a second book on the land boom, Land Boom and Bust, published in 1972.

Fink also mentioned in the book, The Store on the Hill, a history of the George's department store, by Keith Dunstan, published in 1979, and in The Rush to be Rich: a history of the colony of Victoria, 1883-1889, by Geoffrey Serle.

== See also ==
- Melbourne land boom (1880s)
- W.L Ballieu
- Thomas Bent
- Matthew Henry Davies
- James Munro
- City of Melbourne Bank
