= Mercantile Finance (Melbourne) =

Former company in Melbourne, Australia

Mercantile Finance is a shortened name for a former company, based in Melbourne, Australia, which operated between 1881 and 1893. It was officially, first, as a private company, The Mercantile, Finance, Guarantee and Agency Company (Limited). It became a public company, The Mercantile, Finance, Guarantee and Agency Company Limited, in 1885. From 1888, it was known, in its final form as, The Mercantile, Finance, Trustees and Agency Company of Australia Limited. The company was associated with Benjamin Fink and the Melbourne land boom of the 1880s. After the company failed, in mid 1893, numerous instances of questionable behaviour were revealed, but no charges were laid against any of its managers or directors. The liquidation of the company took until 1900 to be completed.

== Origins ==
=== Formation as a private company (1881) ===
The original business that became Mercantile Finance predated Benjamin Fink's involvement in it. Andrew Lyell had a successful business, known as Lyell and Gowan.

In May 1881, the Lyell and Gowan business was folded into a new company, The Mercantile, Finance, Guarantee and Agency Company (Limited), with an authorised capital of £100,000. It was with the formation of that private company that Fink became involved. Andrew Lyell would remain the manager until 1888. The original company's shareholders were private investors.

=== Transformation into a public company (1885) ===
In 1885 a new publicly-listed company was formed to take over the operations of the old. The new company, Mercantile Finance Guarantee and Agency Company Limited, had an authorised capital of £500 000 (in 100,000 shares of £5 each). The initial float was for 25,000 shares, of which 9,000 were offered to the public. Those shares were initially issued partly-paid, leaving £3 15s for later calls if needed. The nature of the business also changed to allow administration of deceased estates, negotiation of mortgages, and other investment functions. The public offer was reportedly oversubscribed.

Presumably, the remaining 16,000 shares in the new company were reserved for the previous private shareholders of the old company. It later emerged that a sum of £6,000 had been paid for the goodwill of the old company.

Benjamin Fink was a director of the new company. Others directors included John Munro Bruce a respected Melbourne businessman—father of Stanley Bruce— Orlando Fenwick, a retail draper and former mayor of Melbourne, Godwin George Crespin (G.G. Crespin), a Melbourne merchant, and Cornelius Job Ham (C.J. Ham), a prominent Melbourne auctioneer. The chairman was John Whittingham, a wealthy merchant and grazier. The managing director was Andrew Lyell, a prominent Melbourne businessman and accountant who was close to Fink and had managed the earlier company—up until 1880, he was MLA for Emerald Hill. The company secretary was John McAllister Howden, who was to become a close associate of Fink and was Andrew Lyell's son-in-law.

The company's bankers were the National Bank of Australasia, and the Federal Bank of Australia, a venture managed by and closely associated with James Munro.

Founding directors of Mercantile Finance Guarantee and Agency Company Limited

John Whittingham, Chairman

Andrew Lyell, Managing Director

Benjamin Fink c.1887

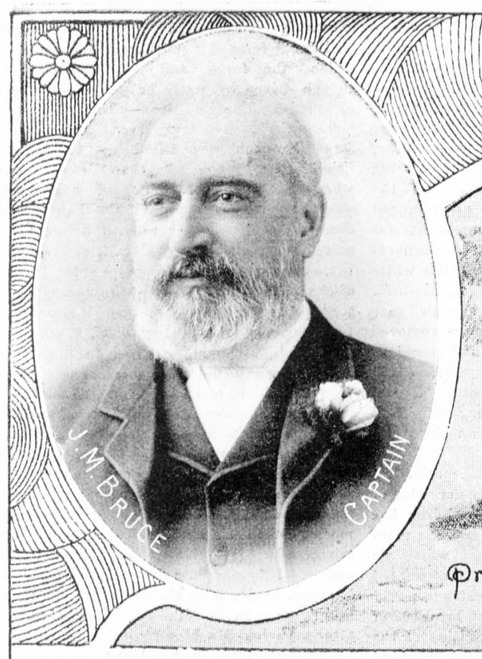
John Munro Bruce, as captain of Melbourne Golf Club (1894)

Orlando Fenwick, 27th Mayor of Melbourne

C.J. Ham, c.1896

G.G. Crespin c.1895

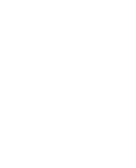
No image is available of John McAlister Howden, Company Secretary, later manager and vice-chairman.

== Growth (1885-1888) ==
=== Apparent prosperity ===
A report in February1894, in Table Talk, cited the remarkable growth in the company's capitalisation, dividends, and share price; "By May,1887, the subscribed capital was raised to £250,000, paid up to £62,000, and a 16 per cent dividend was declared. In November of the same year the capital subscribed was raised to £500,000 paid up to £125,000, and a 24 per cent, dividend declared. On May 31, 1888, the capital subscribed was increased to £1,000,000, £250,000 paid up, and a 50 per cent, dividend declared. In November of the same year the subscribed capital was again increased, a bonus of 15s. per share being written up to capital, making the £5 shares paid up to £2. The capital thus stood at £1,500,000 subscribed, £600,0000 paid up. A dividend at the rate of 30 per cent, was declared, and the reserve fund was £600,000. In view of such colossal profits the shares, paid up to 25s., rose to 9 10s. during that year."

Benjamin Fink had been a director from the formation of the company. He became the chairman, upon the retirement from the board of Mr G.G. Crespin, on 22 June 1888. A report by the company's liquidators, in September 1894, would find that he exercised a "dominant influence .... in the management of the company."

=== Change of name and capital raising (1888) ===
In May 1888, a special meeting of shareholders approved another change to the company's name, from "The Mercantile, Finance, Guarantee and Agency Company Limited " to "The Mercantile, Finance, Trustees and Agency Company of Australia Limited". It was also agreed "to increase the capital of the company beyond the present authorised amount of £1,000,000 to the amount of £5,000,000 by the issue of new shares amounting in the aggregate to £4,000,000 and divided into 800,000 shares of £5 each, the new shares to be issued from time to time"

Prior to the expansion of capital, the final dividend of the old company, Mercantile Finance Trustee and Agency Company, had been 30%, with a 20% bonus, giving a total £46,875 to the existing shareholders.

In June 1888, Mercantile Finance sought to raise more capital by the issue of 100,000 new shares (paid to 1 5s.) with a book value of £125,000, at a premium of £625,000, totalling to £750,000. The timing of the issue fortuitously matched an all time peak in the share price; those subscribing for the new shares, at £7 10s., did so at an apparent discount to the market value. Mercantile Finance shares, paid up to £1 5s., peaked at around £9 13s, in June 1888. In February 1888, the shares had been selling for around £4 8s 6d.

=== McCracken's Brewery float (1888) ===
Mercantile Finance generated some commissions during the float of the McCracken's Brewery business in 1888. Investors could still be found for businesses that were not involved in land and property. However, much later, it would be revealed that profit of the McCracken's float went to Benjamin Fink himself, and it was actually Fink, not the McCracken family, who had sold the business to its new shareholders. It would later emerge that Mercantile Finance had guaranteed £500,000 worth of McCracken Brewery debentures, over the period from March to June 1889.

=== Acquisition of C.J. & T. Ham's business (July 1888) ===
In July 1888, the company bought the large real estate agency business of C.J. & T Ham, but shortly afterwards the sale was cancelled. The reason given at the time was that, "the company could not carry on trustees business and estate agency together." Reportedly, C.J. Ham had a change of heart and pleaded for his business to be returned to him.

However, at the December 1888 half-yearly meeting of Mercantile Finance, it was reported that the acquisition had been completed. The payment made was £10,000 in cash and 4,000 of the new shares, valued at £7 10s. each. Ham would remain a director of Mercantile Finance, until stepping down after the half yearly meeting of December 1892.

=== Changes to articles of association and select committee ===
In August 1888, a select committee of the Legislative Assembly was taking evidence, in connection with the articles of association of Mercantile Finance. In those times the articles of association of a company, and changes to those articles, were often legislated as acts of parliament.

=== The image of a solid institution ===
In September 1888, the company was taking deposits at 4% to 5½%, depending upon the term. It was conducting banking business and offering guarantees, based on its supposed financial strength. Benjamin Fink was chairman, C.J. Ham was vice-chairman, and Fink's close associate, John McAlister Howden was manager.

The company had its head office at 66 Elizabeth Street, Melbourne, and a London office at 2 Lothbury, London, EC..

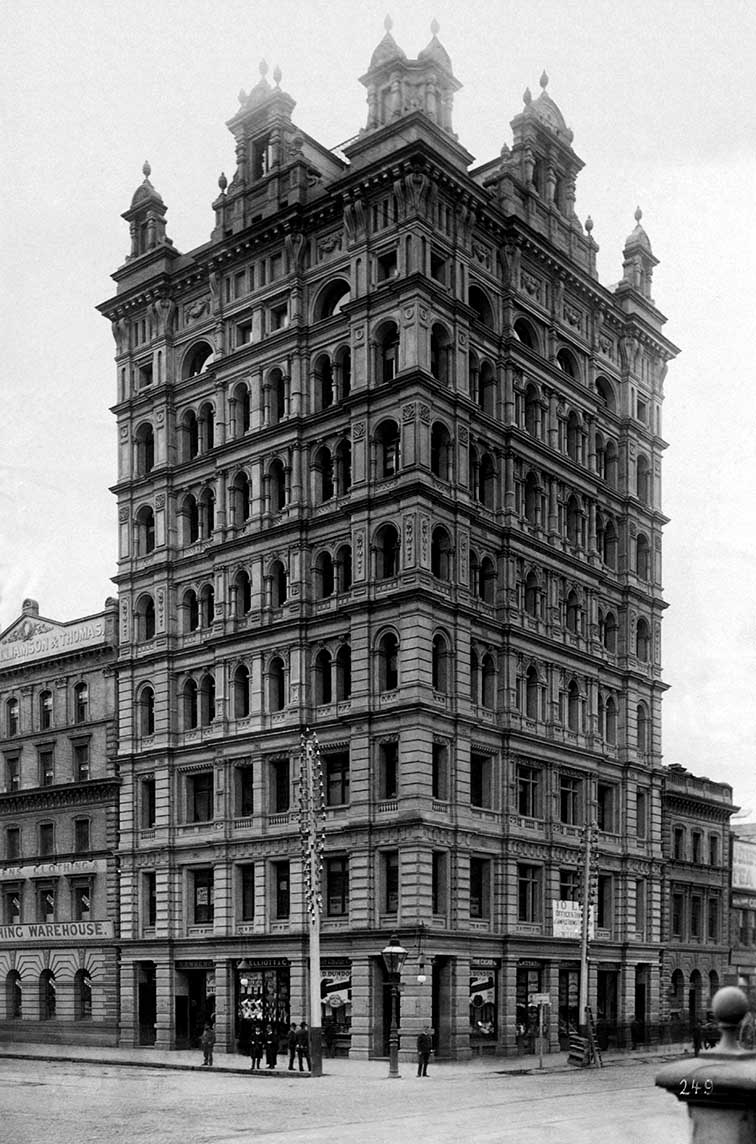
Fink's Building in the 1890s. It was one of Benjamin Fink's properties in Melbourne.

At the half yearly meeting, in December 1888, a dividend of 30% was declared and in addition a bonus of 15s. per share. The bonus was to be applied to increasing the paid up portion of the share from £1 5s. to £2. The huge capital raising had been completed.

Benjamin Fink told the meeting, "At this time, when all investments are suffering from the unprecedented stringency of the money market, all sorts of rumours are current of unknown possibilities about this and other institutions. I may say that, so far as this institution is concerned, such are utterly unfounded, and the balance sheet and report to-day contradict any such statements and cannot but be regarded as satisfactory to investors."

The association with Benjamin Fink was at the time, a positive factor for Mercantile Finance. Before it all came crashing down, Fink was labelled 'The Prince of Speculators', and widely believed to possess immense wealth. He was, for a time, in control of numerous companies and properties, even if it was later revealed—due to falling asset prices—that control rested up on vast amounts of effectively unsecured debt and dubious guarantees.

Before the crash following the land boom, Benjamin Fink, chairman of Mercantile Finance, was portrayed as either a financial genius or as someone who had achieved much by sheer application and hard work; many had either followed his lead in investments or accepted as security his personal guarantees of loans. His entry in Australian Representative Men (1887) stated, "The mere mention of his name in connection with any company is considered ample guarantees of its bona fides".

== The struggle to survive (1889-1892) ==
John Templeton, as colonel of the volunteer militia.

=== Changes ===
==== Board and management changes (1889 - 1892) ====
In February 1889, Benjamin Fink stood down as chairman, making way for Colonel John Montgomery Templeton (1840–1908), an actuary, former manager of National Mutual, former public servant, and colonel of the volunteer militia. John McAlister Howden, the company's then manager became vice-chairman, being replaced as manager by Thomas Ellison, formerly assistant-manager of the Commercial Bank of Australia Limited.

Fink stated his reason for stepping down from the chair as being, "the business of the company made such calls upon his [Fink's] time that it precluded his attention to his other important business interests". He remained a director, being reported as saying that, "The large stake he [Fink] had in the company would be, however, a guarantee to shareholders that he would continue to give his best attention and care to the company's interests."

In June 1892, Mr Fenwick, J. Warnock, and W. Cabena were elected to fill three of four vacancies on the board. (Age 28 June).

==== Shareholding changes (1890 - 1891) ====
Benjamin Fink was, by February 1892, no longer a major shareholder of Mercantile Finance, but two companies that he had set up were.The three largest shareholdings—bearing legal responsibility to pay, if necessary, calls of £3 per share on 27,000, 14,424, and 17,590 shares respectively—were Mortgage Debenture Corporation Limited (registered on 28 November 1890), Mercantile Investment Trust of Australia Limited (already in liquidation by February 1892), and a person by the name of Niels Jensen, with the occupation of "messenger"—probably a 'dummy owner' for someone else. Three company officials, the original chairman (John Whittingham, 13,500 shares) and two directors (John McA. Howden, 9,130 shares, and Orlando Fenwick, 5.400 shares), were still among the largest ten shareholdings. Fink himself held only 1,066 shares, and had distanced himself, effectively, from significant personal financial impact, should Mercantile Finance collapse.

=== Warning signs ===
==== Share price ====
The value of shares in Mercantile Finance had been falling; in the three years up to February 1892, its shares (paid-up to £2) fell in value from £9 10s to just 1s. It was reported that the company had a large exposure, via guarantees, to a company associated with G.W. Taylor, but the company denied that a call on its shares would be necessary.

==== Funding ====
By 1889, sourcing funds from London was becoming more difficult. During 1889, John McAlister Howden, made a visit to London to attempt to borrow funds there for Mercantile Finance and other companies under the control of Benjamin Fink. In a report to Melbourne he stated, "Australian matters and especially Melbourne interests were all under a cloud and every statement in connection with them were [sic] regarded with suspicion. Rumours were current about our company, which were even more exaggerated than in Melbourne."

==== Share calls (1891 - 1892) ====
The company made a call, of 10s. per share, in April 1891. This took the shares paid up value from £2 to £2 10s. However, some shareholders were not in a position to pay the calls. 53,551 Mercantile Finance shares were pledged as security for advances made by Mercantile Finance. It was highly unusual for a company to accept its own shares as security for loans.

At the half-yearly meeting of the company in June 1892, shareholders of Mercantile Finance, were told by the company's chairman, that although calls on shares would be needed, "there was every prospect of this company, meeting all its engagements and having a balance left for shareholders". With the share price at just 3d., it was announced that another call of 5s. per share would be made.

At the half-yearly meeting in December 1892, the chairman stated that conditions had "necessitated further calls of 5s. and 2s 6d each which have under the circumstance been well responded to." . The company had raised in total, £130,930, from the three calls. Many shares had been forfeited due to non-payment of the calls. The nearly worthless shares were then paid up to £2 17s and 6d. Shareholders of xx share 'had professed themselves unable to pay the calls." The chairman advised that legal proceedings against them would be taken, depending upon whether there was a likelihood of obtaining the call money. It was pointless to spend money just to drive some shareholders, with unpaid calls, into insolvency.

==== Cash flow problems ====
The June 1892 half-yearly meeting was informed that What was described as costs of 'company administration' of McCracken's Brewery—probably the ongoing cost of a 3-year guarantee of McCraken's 8% dividend—was taking £16,000 to £17,000 per year. A building at Collins Street and Fleming Place—valued at £118,904 in the balance sheet—was not covering the interest on that amount, and by then had very likely fallen in value.

The company continued to lose money, in the half year to December 1892. In 1892, the company lost £17,406.

==== Other financial failures ====
The news of Benjamin Fink's 'secret composition' in September 1892, seemingly cast doubt over the survival of what had been his main financial company. Further, Mercantile Finance had provided others with guarantees of their transactions with Fink, and those guarantees were then called up.

At the end of January 1893, the Federal Bank of Australia failed. It was one of the bankers to Mercantile Finance. Another bank closely associated with Fink, City of Melbourne Bank failed, in May 1893, at the height of the banking crisis of 1893.

== Failure (July 1893) ==
Mercantile Finance suspended payment, on 18 July 1893. The reason given was "heavy demands upon the resources of fhe company". By the time of the suspension, Benjamin Fink was no longer a director, nor even a substantial shareholder, of the company. The impact on financial institutions and individuals that had accepted guarantees from Mercantile Finance—as a security for loans to other parties or for their transactions with Benjamin Fink—also began to become apparent.

== Liquidation ==
=== The path to liquidation ===
On 28 July 1893, a meeting of shareholders was held to vote on a resolution to voluntarily wind up the company. A report of the meeting stated that, "The chairman in moving the resolution, explained the circumstances that made it necessary that it should be passed. It was impossible for him to say what was the value of the company's assets, and he did not think that any institution in Melbourne could make an estimate. The value of securities depended at all times on the agreement between buyer and seller on the values, and unfortunately since 1889 there had been no such agreement. The past management of the company had been most unfortunate. The directors were authorised to lend moneys on what security they liked, and on no security at all, and large amounts were lent on the company's shares. The directors had acted as if they were partners in the concern, which was a most objectionable method of transacting the business of tho institution. If he could see any prospect of a successful reconstruction, ho would advise the shareholders to that effect, but he could see none, and the only course that appeared open for them was to wind up." The resolution was carried.

The shareholders had moved to liquidate the company ahead of the creditors. However, on 14 November 1893, English creditors applied to the court to have it compulsorily wound up in London, but the liquidation seems to proceeded. In July 1894, English investors were trying to unseat the Melbourne liquidators, and they appointed C. J. Stewart as receiver and liquidator. Their main point of contention was the involvement of some the company's Australian management in the liquidation. The liquidators' work continued nonetheless, with their report being given in September 1894. By January 1895, the receiver, C.J. Stewart, seemed to accept former chairman, John Templeton's role as liquidator. The other liquidator was another director of Mercantile Finance, W. Cabena.

=== Liquidator's report and revelations of questionable conduct ===
The liquidators report was released in September 1894. It listed many instances of questionable conduct. Regarding the company's failure in July 1893, it stated that' "The immediate causes of the suspension of the company appear to have been, first the financial crisis of December 1891; second, the crisis of March and April 1893; third, the failure of a large portion of shareholders to pay the calls made by directors; but the main causes were the extravagantly large advances made and the guarantees issued, both without sufficient security, during 1887 and 1888."

The report noted that Benjamin Fink had been a director from the formation of the company and become the chairman, upon the retirement from the board of Mr Crespin, on 22 June 1888. It also noted that "He had large partnership transactions with the manager (Mr Howden) outside the company's business, which was opposed to the fundamental principle that no director of a public company should have private business relations with the manager."

The liquidators findings included "the dominant influence alleged to have been exercised by Mr. B. J. Fink in the management of the company, and the use to which it was occasionally put, the liquidators find that especially favourable rates for guarantees in favour of that gentleman." An example given was the guaranteeing a payment of £30,000, by Fink, "for the trifling sum of £75".

One notable instance identified was a £10,000 advance, to Fink and Howden, apparently without security. Others were the advances to Howden, totalling £53,350, at 7% interest, "when required in connection with matters out of which the company makes a commission, and on the authority of a minute to this effect," although no relevant minutes of the individual advances had been found. Other advances to Howden left him heavily indebted to the company, for £192,544 9s 10d, while a director. His indebtedness was later transferred to a newly floated company, Mortgage Debenture Corporation, and so were various assets and debts of Fink.

The liquidators also raised instances of questionable conduct in relation to the accounts of two 'land boomers', G.W Taylor (George William Taylor) and Thomas Bent.

The liquidator's report examined the enormous profit of 1888, finding that some of it was bogus. The value of an office building in Collins St had been written up in value, but without selling the building. Worse, the building was mortgaged, and eventually was repossessed by the mortgagee when the company failed. Commissions received from G.W. Taylor were booked as profits, although the commissions were not received in the form of cash, and in any case their value was not enough to prevent a loss on Taylor's account.

In June 1888, Mercantile Finance had sought to raise £125,000 of new capital as 100,000 new shares—paid to £1 5s—at a premium of £625,000, totalling to £750,000. Shareholders were entitled to take up one new shares for every two shares held. The liquidator's report noted that the number of on-market Mercantile Finance share transactions, in the 37 days preceding the share issue, was actually greater than the number of transactions in the previous 37 months. Moreover, most of the share purchases were in the names of officers and clerks of Mercantile Finance, which were later found to have been directed by either Benjamin Fink or John Howden. The liquidator was in no doubt that the transactions drew other unsuspecting investors to follow the apparent trend. While the liquidator was unable to find definitive proof of a share market manipulation, he also noted that that the issue price was three times greater than could be justified by the company's balance sheet, and that "the issue at that price would have been impossible but for the sudden extraordinary rise in the Stock Exchange prices". Further, not all the shares were issued against payments funded by purchasers; some of the new shares were paid by advances to purchasers, from the Mercantile Finance itself, which were not repaid, amounting to around £250,000.

=== Defences ===
The meeting, at which the liquidators announced their findings, on 5 September 1894, was a rowdy one, with many interjections. Nonetheless, two of the major participants in the events spoke at the meeting, in an attempt to defend their actions.

Benjamin Fink, had already left Melbourne, bound for Marsailles, on 31 January 1894. He made his permanent home in England thereafter. It is apparent that he neither commented publicly upon the allegations made against him, nor otherwise defended himself.

One who was present at the liquidators meeting was Thomas Bent. He, like Fink, had been an underwriter of Australian City and Suburban Investment and Banking Company. Also like Fink, Bent had been advanced funds by Mercantile Finance, to take up shares in his role as underwriter, while lodging the same shares as security for the loan. Bent's defence was "when the Australian City and Suburban Company was started he was asked to be an underwriter, but he refused. However, when he was in an unconscious state, as the result of his accident at Parliament House, he did sign the articles as an underwriter, though on recovering he refused to sign any bill, and always repudiated his connection with the company. He only became a director when the company got into trouble, and he had never received 1d." His explanation was howled down by those at the meeting.

The chairman clashed with Bent over matters of fact, such as whether or not Bent had signed promissory notes. Bent lapsed into what was described as a "gloomy silence." The secretary of the liquidators subsequently produced a receipt by Bent's solicitors acknowledging the handing over of promissory notes, which fell due at various dates in 1889 and 1890. The total value of the notes concerned was reported as being £76,444.

When John McAlister Howden rose to defend himself, many left the meeting, while "making use of various uncomplimentary remarks as they did so." Howden "asked for fair play to read a lengthy document with a view to exculpating himself from the blame which the liquidators cast upon him. He had unflinchingly and loyally endeavoured to serve the company, and could not be held personally liable for any mistakes that had been made." The chairman restored order in the meeting, and Howden read aloud his document; it was reported in full, in The Argus. The chairman also stated that Howden had been allowed to express his views to the liquidators, before they had made their report, with the implication being that their criticism of him had not been rebutted by his statement.

The chairman, "in answer to a question as to whether the liquidators proposed to take criminal proceedings against the late directors, said nothing was found in the transaction to justify such a course being adopted." Nobody was ever charged over the events at Mercantile Finance.

=== Legal disputes ===
In May 1895, the liquidators of Mercantile Finance, who had sued Benjamin Fink's wife, Catherine Fink, for £2,707 owed for share calls, agreed to accept just £358 15s., as a final settlement.

=== The outcome of the liquidation ===
Creditors did not see any of their money, until the end of 1894, when they received the first dividend of one shilling in the pound. It was stated unequivocally, in August 1895, "that there was, unfortunately, no hope for the shareholders in the liquidation of the company". The investments of the shareholders in the company had been wiped out, as creditors had preference. Worse, shareholders were liable to pay calls on their worthless shares.

During the financial year to the end of July 1895, large claims arising from the company's loan guarantees were admitted. The total admitted debt due to creditors was £1,068,987, by the end of 1897. On the other side of the ledger, those owing the company money, including among others, Thomas Bent, Benjamin Fink, and Catherine Fink, sought to remove their liabilities by either denying responsibility defending legal actions against them, or by transferring their shares into the name of 'dummy' shareholders, all of which delayed distributions to creditors.

The lengthy liquidation was still proceeding, at the end of 1899, when a fifth dividend to creditors of 6d. in the pound was paid. It took until April 1900 for the liquidation to be completed. By then, £166,372 2s. 2d. had been received from calls on the company's shares and £38,012 12s. 3d. from asset sales. After deducting the cost of the liquidation and other charges, the dividends to creditors totalled £179,509 12s. 5d. Creditors had been paid 3s. 4d. in the pound, or more precisely 3s. and 3 49/50d.

In 1910, a residual amount, of £5 11s., from the by then defunct company, Mercantile Finance, was ordered to be paid into consolidated revenue.

== Aftermath ==
=== Economic depression ===
The failure of Mercantile Finance was one of the larger of the many failed ventures associated with the Melbourne land boom of the 1880s, and it occurred during the height of banking crisis of 1893.

Although, during the 1890s, Australia as a whole experienced an economic depression—real GDP fell by 17% in 1892 and 1893— it was worse and longer lasting in Victoria. The population of Greater Melbourne actually declined, from 490,000 to 458,000, during the years from 1891 to 1897, as many sought opportunities elsewhere.

=== Legal and regulatory reforms ===
Criticism of the laxity of the existing laws, which had permitted excesses—such as floating companies at inflated valuations, manipulation of public companies for benefit of directors, questionable voluntary liquidations of indebted companies, and abuse of 'secret compositions'—led to a tightening of company and Insolvency laws, and increased regulation of banks and other lending institutions. Indirectly, these changes were a legacy of the land boom, and its spectacular financial failures and destruction of wealth.

Michael Cannon in his book, The Land Boomers, wrote: "Through the eyes of a later and more fortunate generation, the land boom era may be regarded as a watershed to the development of a free but regulated private enterprise system in Australia" and that, "The disasters of the 1890s made it apparent to most people that while uncontrolled capitalism might be a marvellous way of unleashing human energy and ambition, it could also be a devilish force capable of recoiling indiscriminately on the just and the unjust and causing enormous suffering."

=== Illawarra Harbour and Land Corporation ===
Work at the entrance to Lake Illawarra ceased at some point during the second half of 1893. In February 1894, the two principals of the harbour works contractor, David Jollie Brand and David Leggatt Dryborough, petitioned to have Illawarra Harbour and Land Corporation wound up, presumably to recover money that they had not been paid for their work to date. By the beginning of 1895, it appeared that the port scheme had stalled.

In a select committee hearing in 1898, Thomas Andrew de Wolf, stated that company's funding problems around this time related to, "One of the largest shareholders having a great interest in this company was the Mercantile Finance Company of Melbourne" and he added that company was, "very badly insolvent". Benjamin Fink himself reportedly held a major interest in the Illawarra Harbour port venture, and was publicly associated with it, at least prior to his financial troubles.

Despite the revival of the port scheme, in 1895, and sub-division and sale of some land, in 1897—perhaps the real driver of the venture—the port was never built. The scheme was abandoned around 1902. Absence of a port there, in the longer term, doomed the newly-opened Dapto Smelting Works.

=== Survivors ===
Andrew Lyell, although passing through a 'liquidation by agreement' in 1890, resumed a career as an accountant and conciliator, after parting company with Merchantile Finance, in 1888. He was president of the Incorporated Institute of Accountants, Victoria—now known as CPA Australia—from 1894 to 1896.

John McAlister Howden (1853–1921)—despite his involvement as the manager and later vice-chairman of Mercantile Finance, and the findings about his conduct, in the report of its liquidators—was also president of the Incorporated Institute of Accountants, Victoria, in 1901-02 and 1906.

George Meudell was assistant manager of Mercantile Finance, under Howden. He was later a stockbroker, company promoter and accountant, and was a contributor to The Bulletin for over 40 years. He wrote an autobiographical book, The Pleasant Career of a Spendthrift , which includes material on his time at Mercantile Finance. It caused a severe reaction when published, in 1929, and was effectively suppressed. It was revised, to present some of its subjects in a much better light, and republished as The Pleasant Career of a Spendthrift, and His Later Reflection, in 1936.

Colonel John Templeton, chairman of Mercantile Finance between February 1889 and its failure in July 1893, spent many years in charge of its liquidation. He resumed a career at National Mutual, and continued in his other role as a Colonel of the volunteer militia. A biography of Templeton does not mention his four years as chairman of Mercantile Finance, nor do his obituaries. However, despite his previous history with the company, he seems to have performed the role of liquidator competently and diligently.

Benjamin Fink, spent most of the remainder of his life in England, but the Fink family was able to retain or recover part of its wealth. His wife Catherine Fink (1854–1943)—described as "a tall handsome woman", and as "the brainy power behind the throne"— became vital to Fink's family's retaining or recovering much of its wealth, during the 1890s. After Fink's death in 1909, she continued to manage the family's investments, and made some large philanthropic donations.

Thomas Bent was said to have paid only such of his bills as he needed to avoid insolvency, and he did successfully avoid insolvency. Out of politics for a time, he survived as a dairy farmer, at Port Fairy, until re-elected to the Victorian Legislative Assembly. He went on to become the Premier of Victoria, in 1904, and was knighted in 1908, although he was under investigation on allegations of corrupt behaviour, months before his death in 1909. There is a statue in his honour, and a suburb, Bentleigh, named for him.

== See also ==
- Melbourne land boom (1880s)
- Benjamin Fink
- City of Melbourne Bank
