= City of Melbourne Bank =

Defunct bank that was based in Melbourne, Victoria, Australia

City of Melbourne Bank, officially City of Melbourne Bank Limited, was a bank in Melbourne, Victoria, Australia. It operated between 1873 and 1895. The bank was a major source of financing during the Melbourne land boom of the 1880s. The bank incurred huge losses. It survived the banking crisis of 1893, but its compulsory liquidation in 1895 and subsequent court cases revealed the true financial position of the bank and the extent of its mismanagement. Some directors and bank officers faced trial, in 1896, but were acquitted.

== Foundation and growth ==
=== Early years ===
City of Melbourne Bank had resulted from the renaming of Victoria Finance and Agency Company in October 1873. It sought subscribers for its shares in November 1873. It raised more capital in 1877. One of the bank's founders was Thomas Loader (1830–1901). It gave every sign of being a conventional, profitable colonial bank.

=== Bank run (June 1879) ===
On 5 June 1879, there was a run on the City of Melbourne Bank. Depositors had been alarmed by another small bank, Australian and European Bank, suspending payment. The bank did not need assistance to make payments, although some of those intending to withdraw funds may have been dissuaded from withdrawing by the arrival of large bags of cash. Unknown to the public, these turned out to be bags of copper coins being deposited by the tramway company.

=== Merger (1882) ===
City of Melbourne Bank building

The Joint Stock Bank of Victoria, controlled by Benjamin Fink, merged with the larger, City of Melbourne Bank, in 1882. Fink and other Joint Stock Bank of Victoria shareholders received a significant shareholding in the merged banking venture, which was carried on under the name of City of Melbourne Bank. In the process, City of Melbourne Bank took over two branches outside Melbourne, at Creswick and Maryborough.

Fink remained a shareholder of the City of Melbourne Bank, until at the latest March 1891, by which time he had sold his shares. He ceased to be a director around the same time.

=== New building (1886) ===
The bank constructed a new building for its headquarters and Melbourne branch, which was completed in 1886.

=== London branch (1886) ===
In 1886, the bank established a London branch, giving it access to a far larger pool of depositors. Mr Edmund Rouse was appointed manager of that branch. The bank's London branch and office was at 117 Bishopsgate Street.

== The land boom ==
=== The frenzy ===
Around 1885, the established trading banks already had large exposures to loans secured by land. Those banks began to tighten credit, which should have cooled rising land values. Initially the value of land sales fell, from a total value of around £12 million, in 1885, to around £2¼ million in 1886.

However, other entities known as building societies and 'land banks' were established, with the specific aim of lending for land purchases, or even directly investing in land and other properties. Banking laws were lax, with low barriers to entry and little regulation of banks' operations, facilitating the proliferation and growth of these new financial entities. The building societies and 'land banks' also offered attractive interest rates to depositors, and their depositors' funds fuelled increased lending. Significantly, many of the new land banks were closely connected to or effectively controlled by people who were heavily involved in land speculation, although most such institutions raised funds from investors and the public through the issue of shares.

Around 1887, the penultimate and most frenzied phase of the land boom began. It was exacerbated by the buoyant economy, booming stock market, the huge volume of funds brought into Victoria, in the form of British loans and investments, and the new land banks' lending practices.

In 1888, the stock market's capitalisation reached £50-million, but by then the booming mining sector only accounted for £3.5-million. The land and finance sector was the largest, with a total capitalisation of £33-million.

=== The bank and the boom ===
In April 1887, the City of Melbourne Bank declared a 12½% dividend, on profits of £51,291 15s. 11d. Its accounts showed deposits of £11,550,000 and that it had made loans totalling £12,121,000, a relatively small proportion of which was provided from the bank's capital.

=== The end of the land boom ===
By 1889, land values had risen to such an extent that it was clear to many that a speculative bubble existed. Land was the security for the many loans, and the lending organisations were heavily exposed should land prices fall, as were the share prices of the 'land banks'. Commercial and residential property was also becoming an uneconomic as a 'geared' investment. Depositors expected a 6% return, but rental yields—compressed by overly high valuations—had fallen to 2.5%. The boom in commercial property too could not last. Land sales slowed and rents began to fall, indicating that the boom had peaked.

Stocks related to land and property investments began to fall, and continued to fall. In the three years up to February 1892, the price of Mercantile Finance shares (paid-up to £2), fell in value from £9 10s to just 1s.

In December 1889, Premier Permanent Building Society suspended payments to depositors and closed its doors. There were allegations of gross mismanagement, later culminating in criminal convictions. It had lent more than three times its paid up capital and used its own loans as security. This society's secretary was James Mirams, who was among the first land boomers to have a 'liquidation by arrangement', in March 1890, paying his creditors just 2d. in the pound. He would be sentenced to a year in prison, in 1890.

The Associated Banks of Victoria conflicts of interest if banks were associated with building societies or 'land banks'. In 1889, they introduced a regulation excluding banks that had an interest in a building society.

However, it was not until the years from 1891 to 1893 that the full consequences of the excesses of the boom became apparent, through the successive financial failures of multiple 'land boomers', their various corporate structures, and ultimately some banks. The massive destruction of wealth also affected the general economy, making matters worse; businesses closed, and ceased to pay rents, depositors lost their savings, and workers lost their jobs.

The final trigger of the inevitable crash came in the form of the Baring crisis of November 1890. It related to loans made by Barings Bank to the far away country of Argentina. Argentina defaulted on loans of nearly £48,000,000 during 1890. British bankers and investors with loans to Australian banks and other financial institutions feared a repeat of the Argentinean circumstances in Australia. British funding dried up, and with it the means by which some of the land boom entities were hanging on.

=== Early bank failures ===
Interest warrant issued by London branch (June 1892)

The first of the 'land banks' to fail was the Imperial Banking Company Limited. Nearly £200,000 was lost in its collapse. It had been floated in 1886, by Sir Benjamin Benjamin (1834–1905), Lord Mayor of Melbourne. It began life making advances for land sales, but its articles of association were later amended, to allow it to buy, hold, and sell land on its own account. The bank suspended payments on 24 July 1891.

Another 'land bank', the Land Credit Bank, suspended payments on 1 December 1891. Multiple instances of fraud, perpetrated by its manager, George Nicholson Taylor, were uncovered soon afterwards. Just days later, on 4 December 1891, The Metropolitan Bank and Building Society and the Standard Bank suspended payments. The Mercantile Bank of Australia closed on 5 March 1892; its financial position had been undermined by fraud and large loans to its own directors.

However, until later in 1892, there appeared to be no concerns about the City of Melbourne Bank.

=== Land boomer insolvencies ===
==== David Munro and Munro & Company ====
David Munro (1844–1898), a wealthy engineer, contractor, and manufacturer of machinery, was one of the first 'land boomers' to declare his personal insolvency, in April 1890. As a contractor, Munro had built two fine bridges across the Yarra River—Princes Bridge and Queens Bridge—and two railway lines. Plunging into land speculation, he had taken large loans from banks to purchase land for subdivision. Using his wife's name, Munro had borrowed further large amounts from Benjamin Fink's Mercantile Finance, which he had also used to speculate in land. He had floated a 'land bank', Caledonian Land Bank Ltd, but some of its shareholders accused him of selling his properties, at Brighton and Canterbury, into the float of that company, at inflated valuations, leading to demands that Munro buy their shares. His business David Munro and Co. Limited had a large overdraft from the City of Melbourne Bank. The bank insisted that Munro give up the management of his hitherto successful business, thereby damaging its performance. That led to a call on the shares, which he could not meet. Having run out of options, he declared insolvency, as did his wife. Munro died, in greatly reduced circumstances, of a haemorrhage and by then his chronic alcoholism, in 1898.

==== Benjamin Fink's failure and its impact on the bank ====
Bejnamin Fink's partly-secured and unsecured debtors faced a combined stated deficiency of £1,019,275. The news, in October 1892, that a majority of his creditors had agreed to accept just a halfpenny in the pound on that amount—just £2,123 10s—was reported, "naturally to have startled the whole business community". The same report also stated, "in financial matters wherever there is secrecy there is suspicion, and though Mr. Fink has set a good example to other 'compounders' in openly avowing his embarrassment, a more detailed schedule of his assets and liabilities would have strengthened his position and that of his creditors." One such creditor was the City of Melbourne Bank.

When news of Fink's financial predicament reached London, the London directors of the bank cabled a straightforward question to its Melbourne office; "Are you involved in the failure of Fink? To what extent?" The bank's manager, Colin Longmuir, cabled back his answer; "Overdrafts and discounts £57,000. We are fully covered." He then provided a balance sheet—later shown to be false—which was relied upon by the directors to declare a 10% dividend, at the end of October 1892. The chairman told a shareholders meeting that "With large funds at their disposal, the directors had carefully gone through the accounts of the bank and written off such as they considered to be either valueless or not equal to the book amounts. Ample provision had been made also for contingent losses, and the bank was now in a thoroughly healthy and sound condition. Of course all these provisions had curtailed the profits of the bank, but the directors considered they were acting in the very best interests of the shareholders, and in the only prudent way."

At the time of Fink's 'secret composition', it was not known that there was in fact around another £310,000 owed by Fink to the City Bank of Melbourne. That loan was helpfully written off by the bank, in secret, probably to prevent it becoming known that the bank itself was, by then, itself facing insolvency.

Benjamin Fink's main corporate entity, Mercantile Finance, suspended payment, on 18 July 1893, by which time Fink was no longer a director, nor even a substantial shareholder, of that company. The impact on financial institutions and individuals that had accepted guarantees from Mercantile Finance—as a security for loans to other parties or for their transactions with Benjamin Fink—also began to become apparent.

== Banking crisis of 1893 ==
At the end of January 1893, the Federal Bank of Australia failed. It was controlled by James Munro, and was the first of the banks—as opposed to a 'land bank' or building society—to fail. It is generally regarded as the beginning of the banking crisis. Depositors were unnerved and increasingly inclined to withdraw their funds, sometimes rapidly, based on news and rumours, or to convert a bank's banknotes to coinage. Bank runs became increasingly a risk, to banks already distressed by the end of the boom and falling land and property values. Over the weekend of 29 - 30 April 1893, the National Bank informed the Premier that it would suspend payments on 1 May 1893.

The Colonial Government of Victoria declared the week, from Monday 1 May to 5 May 1893, as bank holidays, which kept banks closed. Some thought it was intended to allow fragile banks to have some time to come up with plans for financial reconstruction, but it led to some banks suspending payment immediately. Two banks, the Union Bank of Australia and the Bank of Australasia, defied the bank holiday and remained open, and runs on them quickly subsided. Other banks, particularly those with branches in other colonies, such as the Bank of New South Wales, reopened after a short closure, mainly for fear of inducing runs in other Australian colonies.

One of the banks that suspended payments in May 1893 was the City of Melbourne Bank. The bank reopened, after just 17 days, pending a capital reconstruction. However, although not revealed at the time, the bank had given large loans, with inadequate security, and the bank's books did not reveal the extent of its true exposure. Another important change was that the bank had far less depositors funds, because British depositors had refused to roll over their deposits falling due in May 1893. The British deposits totalled around £3,260,000 compared to £1,470.000 from Australian colonies, and this loss of funds alone was enough to doom the bank.

== Liquidation and aftermath ==
=== The path to liquidation ===
The bank had been attempting a capital reconstruction, since late May 1893. In April 1894, the bank held its first meeting as a reconstructed bank, announced a profit, and declared a 5% dividend on its preference shares only. The chairman, Thomas Loader, concluded his remarks, by saying, "Taking all things into consideration, they could look forward with confidence to the future of the bank." The meeting became lively when shareholders came to speak. A shareholder, John Leishman, stated that the director's report was inadequate. He asked it was true that two loans totalling £41,000 had been made to parties with now valueless security; the chairman denied that was true. Leishman also queried the level of remuneration of some bank officials.

The unexpected death of the general manager of the bank Colin Longmuir, in early June 1894, preceded the events that led to the bank's liquidation. On 31 July 1894, the London board of the bank resigned, in protest against the dismissal of the Melbourne board. In August 1894, the bank's former London manager, Edmund Rouse, sailed for Melbourne; he was going to investigate the bank's finances and management. In November 1894, the Melbourne newspaper, Table Talk, queried the integrity of the bank's balance sheet.

British depositors and shareholder had already appointed a receiver and liquidator, Mr. C. J. Stewart, by mid July 1895, while the bank was still trading. British creditors sought to have a compulsory winding up of the bank. They succeeded in obtaining such an order in London in July 1895.

Edmund Rouse presented his findings, in a report—initially not made public—dated 31 July 1895. Writing on the bank's management, he stated that it was of, "the most reckless character, large advances being made from time to time to land speculators and others without sufficient inquiries as to the value or earning power of the securities taken to secure such, and it appears from the securities book; that in the majority of cases no outside valuations were obtained." Further that, "The only one line of policy discernible in the past management of the bank was never to face a loss, and to submit to any additional losses that might be incurred by bolstering up and keeping afloat hopelessly insolvent customers in order to prevent publicity being given to their enormous commitments to such persons. Indeed it is impossible on any other theory to account for the others a wanton manner in which the banks funds have been wasted." He held Longmuir largely responsible, and concluded that "Mr Longmuir must in some cases have had personal motives for the very generous manner he treated obligates of the bank".

An amended reconstruction scheme was rejected by British shareholders. At 11 a.m. morning of 7 August 1895, the bank suspended payment. The Melbourne directors immediately submitted two petitions to have the bank's business wound up, voluntarily. Directors noted a loss, in the half year to March 1895 of £13,366, and that reduced property values would necessitate a write down in the bank's capital. British creditors obtained a second compulsory winding up order—this time in Melbourne—in late August 1895, which hand the effect of placing the liquidation out of the hands of the bank's directors.

In September 1894, there were £41,750 worth of banknotes issued by the bank in circulation. Following the suspension of payment, those banknotes were no longer negotiable with other banks; those left holding City of Melbourne Bank banknotes faced an uncertain outcome, perhaps as minor unsecured creditors.

=== Absent players ===
Two individuals were later singled out in the liquidator's report as having been responsible for the state of the bank, Colin Longmuir and Benjamin Fink.

==== Colin Longmuir ====
Colin Longmuir

A Scottish immigrant, who had banking experience in Scotland and Mauritius, Longmuir joined the City of Melbourne Bank, as accountant, in 1876. Four years later, he became the general manager.

Longmuir died unexpectedly, in early June 1894, before the true state the City of Melbourne Bank, became known. Longmuir died on board R.M.S. Arcadia, while on route to London. He died, before the ship reached Colombo. A rumour circulated that Longmuir was not dead, but had left the ship at Colombo. The rumour was denied by the shipping line, P & O; Longmuir had been buried at sea, and a death certificate had been issued by the ship's surgeon. He was only 49 years old, and had been in apparently good health.

==== Benjamin Fink ====
Benjamin Fink, 1887

Benjamin Fink was a director of the City of Melbourne Bank from 1882 to 1891, but had other vast and complex business arrangements and investments, including the financial institution, Mercantile Finance. Before it all came crashing down, Fink was labelled 'The Prince of Speculators', and widely believed to possess immense wealth. He was, for a time, in control of numerous companies and properties, even if it was later revealed—due to falling asset prices—that control rested up on vast amounts of effectively unsecured debt and dubious guarantees. Fink escaped formal bankruptcy, using a mechanism known as officially as a 'liquidation by arrangement', also referred to as a 'secret composition'. In October 1892, his creditors agreed to be paid just a half penny in the pound, a decision said "naturally to have startled the whole business community" The liquidator's report noted the undue influence that Fink had over the bank', in conjunction with Longmuir.

According to George Meudell, who worked with him, Fink left Melbourne after he "was threatened with assassination". On 31 January 1894, Fink, his wife and their two children left Melbourne, bound for Marsailles, aboard the Ville de la Ciotat. Fink made London his home. Some sources say that Benjamin Fink, never returned to Australia, but that it is incorrect. It is recorded that he was in Victoria, during parts of 1896 and 1897. There are reports of another visit, during much of 1899 and 1900.

However, Fink was absent from Melbourne, in the crucial years from early 1894 to late 1896, when damaging allegations against him were made. It is apparent that he neither commented publicly upon the allegations, nor otherwise defended himself.

=== Revelations ===
The contents of Rouse's report of 31 July 1895 only became public, in March 1896. A court case, in 1896, would reveal the enormous loans that the bank had made, to just three customers—Benjamin Fink (£312,865), David Munro and Co. (£401,383), and Fergusson and Mitchell (£235,181)—in total £949,429, while the bank's capital was just £500,000. None of that money would be recovered.

it was also revealed the bank had also lent £253,000 to a land speculator Charles Henry.James. James paid his creditors just 6¾d. in the pound, on a debt of £851,842, when he was finally made bankrupt, in 1897. Colin Longmuir, the bank's manager had been advance £75,000, over ten different accounts, for the purpose of buying shares. The security he had provided was found to be worthless, and the entire amount improperly advanced to Longmuir had been written off.

A later trial of bank officials would reveal that Benjamin Fink was a large shareholder of the bank, with 6,548 shares, but that these shares were held in the name of a bank official by the name of McLachlan. Attention was drawn to a minute of a directors' meeting, of 1889, "B.J. Fink Direct liabilities, £112,000 ; overdue bills, £51,884 ; contingent £937. His account must not be increased". However, later via complicated arrangements Fink's indebtedness did increase.

The City of Melbourne Bank had guaranteed interest payments to the Savings Bank, on a £40,000 mortgage taken out by Wallach & Co. and Benjamin Fink. From around March 1894, Wallach & Co. was effectively controlled by various officers of the City of Melbourne Bank, who had manoeuvred the absent Benjamin Fink out of his role as managing director, by making a share call that he could not pay. To do that the bank had acquired shares from Maurice Aron and funded the call on Aron's shares by an advance of £5.000.

=== Prosecutions and trial ===
On 24 August 1896, four directors—Thomas Loader, James Williamson, J.L. Roberts, and Jenkyn Collier—and two auditors—Andrew Burns and J.B. McQuie—were committed for trial, charged with concurring to issue two false balance sheets, in 1892 and 1893. It was alleged that the bank had paid £45,000 in dividends, while insolvent. Their trial began, before Justice Holroyd, on 21 September 1896.

The defendants were represented by Alfred Deakin, James Purves, QC, and P.D. Phillips. It was generally conceded that the balance sheets were false. The defence would focus on attempting to show that the bank's manager, Colin Longmuir, had been responsible for all the fraudulent actions, painting the accused directors and auditors as unknowing dupes of Longmuir. These tactics were assisted by Longmuir having died two years earlier and being unable to stand trial with the others. A problem for all participants in the trial was the complex nature of the evidence, and the fact that the perpetrator(s) had tried to conceal their fraudulent activities.

After the evidence had been given, Justice Edward Dundas Holroyd gave his summing up, over two days. It seemed overall to favour the defence's position by blaming Longmuir for the fraud.

On Monday 2 November 1896, the jury retired to consider its verdict, returning at 3 p.m. with a verdict of not guilty. An attempt by the jury foreman to add a rider to the verdict that the directors had been negligent in their duties was ruled out of order by the judge, and the accused were discharged.

On the following day, The Age opined that. "Clearly the public have little or no protection against the most palpable frauds ... The City Bank trial and its revelations will sink deep into the minds of the people and accentuate the demand everywhere made for a radical amendment of the law under which such gross doings have been possible."

== Remnants ==
The building that had once housed the Melbourne headquarters and branch of the City of Melbourne Bank—at the corner of Collins and Elizabeth Streets—was taken over by the Royal Bank. It was demolished in 1939, and was replaced by a new building, initially a branch of the E.S. & A. Bank. That building still houses the Royal Bank branch of the ANZ Bank.

The long-gone bank's share certificates are still traded, but as collectables. Surviving City of Melbourne banknotes, in denominations of £5, £10 and £20, exist, but are extremely rare, usually being specimen banknotes. Their value to collectors is now far greater than their nominal face value.
