= Issued shares =

Shares of a corporation owned by shareholders

In economics and law, issued shares are the shares of a corporation which have been allocated (allotted) and are subsequently held by shareholders. The act of creating new issued shares is called issuance. Allotment is simply the transfer of shares to a subscriber. After allotment, a subscriber becomes a shareholder, though usually that also requires formal entry in a share registry.

== Overview ==
The number of shares that can be issued is limited to the total authorized shares. Issued shares are those shares which the board of directors and/or shareholders have agreed to issue, and which have been issued. Issued shares are the sum of outstanding shares held by shareholders; and treasury shares are shares which had been issued but have been repurchased by the corporation. The latter generally have no voting rights or rights to dividends.

The issued shares of a corporation form the equity capital of the corporation, and some corporations are required by law to have a minimum value of equity capital, while others may not need any or just a nominal number. The value of the issued shares is determined at the time they are issued and the value does not change, in relation to the issuing corporation after that time.

Shares are most commonly issued fully paid, in which case the liability of the shareholders is limited to the amount paid on the shares; but they may also be issued shares that are partly paid, with unlimited liability, subject to guarantee, or some other form.

=== Basic formulae ===
$$\rm{Shares\ authorized} = \rm{Shares\ issued} + \rm{Shares\ unissued}$$
$$\rm{Shares\ issued} = \rm{Shares\ outstanding} + \rm{Treasury\ shares}$$

== See also ==
- Share capital
- Shares outstanding
- Treasury shares
