= Partly paid share =

A partly paid share is a share in a company which has only partial been paid compared to the par value, with the understanding that as the company requires more funds, calls will be made from time to time to request more money until the shares are fully paid, when no further calls can be made. The amounts may be specified in the prospectus or unspecified, and the shareholder is liable when a call is made by the company until the shares are fully paid.

== History ==
In the early 20th century, partly paid shares were sometimes issued by companies such as banks and insurance companies, as they could call on their shareholders for further funds as necessary. This was good for the financial institution as they could quickly increase their capital when required but was unpopular with shareholders as they had an unknown liability that could be called upon at any time and for this reason the practice largely died out.

The practice was revised during the 1980s privatisations to attract more small shareholders. Shareholders in these IPOs make an initial payment, and then one or more subsequent pre-specified payments on specific dates.

== Calls on shares ==
Calls on partly paid shares may be made in accordance with a schedule of calls set out in the company's original prospectus or it may be made at the discretion of the directors.

When a call is made, each shareholder affected by the call becomes a debtor of the company, until each debt has been satisfied. The usual rules of debt collections apply to such debts. The obligation to pay a call flows with the share, so that it falls on the person who is the owner of the relevant shares at the time a call is made. The obligation falls on the owner at the time of a call, who may have disposed of the shares by the time payment is due, so that the new owner is free of the obligation to pay the call.

For a limited liability company, the legal right of the company to make calls and the obligation to pay them ceases when shares become fully paid. In Australia, a mining exploration company may be formed as a no liability company, which is not able to make calls on shares, even on partly paid shares.

== See also ==
- Allen v Gold Reefs of West Africa Ltd
- Convertible security
- Issued shares
- Share class
