= Orlando Fenwick =

Australian mayor (1822–1897)

27th Mayor of Melbourne
- In office 1871–1872
- Preceded by: Thomas McPherson
- Succeeded by: Thomas O'Grady

Personal details
- Born: 1822 Gravesend, Kent
- Died: 9 December 1897 (aged 74–75) Melbourne, Victoria

Orland Fenwick (1822 – 9 December 1897) was Mayor of Melbourne from 1871 to 1872, after having joined the council in 1865. Born in Gravesend, Kent in England, Fenwick immigrated to Victoria in November 1852, where he ran a retail and wholesale drapery business. Following his term as mayor, he remained on the city council until his death.

Preceded by Thomas McPherson	Mayor of Melbourne; 1871–1872	Succeeded by Thomas O'Grady
