= Melbourne land boom (1880s) =

Speculative bubble in the property and equity markets of Melbourne, Australia

The Melbourne land boom of the 1880s was an economic boom that occurred in Melbourne, Victoria, Australia. It culminated in a speculative bubble during the years 1885 to 1889. Although now primarily associated with land and property, there was a concurrent stock market boom, accompanied by numerous company floats, many of a highly speculative nature. Following the Baring crisis of late 1890, British funding became constrained. There was a market crash, followed by the financial failures of numerous individuals, companies, and banks, which culminated in the banking crisis of 1893 and various scandals over unethical behaviour, mismanagement, and fraud. Australia plunged into an economic depression that was most severe and longest-lasting in Victoria, which took around 15 years to recover economically.

== The Boom ==
=== Precedents ===
Before the boom in land prices, during the 1880s, there had been two earlier booms in Melbourne land and property. The first of these began, around 1837, soon after the first land sales in the newly-established town of Melbourne—then still a part of the Port Phillip District of the Colony of New South Wales—and ended with the widespread economic depression of the 1840s. The second land price boom occurred during the 1850s, after gold was discovered in the newly-separated Colony of Victoria. The second boom too fell away, after gold production peaked. The still considerable level of gold production ensured that the economy was little affected when land prices fell.

=== Origins ===
The cumulative effect of the gold rush upon the Victorian colonial economy, and a rapidly growing population of Greater Melbourne—it grew by 70% between 1881 and 1891—created a strong underlying demand for housing and commercial development in Melbourne. Paradoxically, some of Melbourne's growth was due to the slow decline of gold production in Victoria; many left the goldfields towns for Melbourne, as what was formerly a port town developed into a commercial, manufacturing and services centre.

In the late 1880s, a speculative bubble occurred, now known as the land boom. The beginning of the land boom is generally attributed to the Victorian colonial government's securing large loans from Britain, for 'reproductive public works', mainly railways and irrigation works. Employment in Victoria boomed. During the 1880s, government and private loans from Britain would total around £50 million.

New railway and cable tramway lines were constructed, as were new roads and new bridges across the Yarra River. These developments increased the demand for suburban land, which became easier to reach. A vision of Melbourne as a metropolis took hold, captured in the phrase, 'Marvellous Melbourne', said to have been first used by a British journalist, George Augustus Sala, when he visited in 1885. That vision also fed demand for commercial properties in the city itself.

Increasing land prices in the city itself, coupled with the 'American elevator', encouraged development of taller, multi-storey, office buildings and consequently a construction boom in central Melbourne. Ventures making use of newer technological innovations contributed to the rapid growth of the metropolis, such as Melbourne Telephone Exchange Company—the first public telephone system in Australia—which commenced operation in August 1880, and the gasworks that supplied the new suburbs with town gas.

=== Political connections ===
==== Politicians ====
In 19th century Australian colonies, it was quite usual to find prominent businessmen—and they were all men—sitting in colonial parliaments. Parliamentarians in Victoria had only received payment for their duties, initially to compensate for their expenses, since 1870, and a separate income was necessary. Legislation to pay members for their services, and refusal of the Legislative Council to pass it, led to a crisis known as Black Wednesday, in 1878.

Representatives from working class or organised labour backgrounds were still unusual. The 1890s saw the beginnings of working class political activity, but most parliamentarians of the time favoured laissez-faire policies. The main issue in contention was the choice of economic policy, between protection and free trade. The preponderance of businessmen was significant, given the role that parliaments of the time had in passing acts that changed the articles of association of financial sector companies, making or amending company law, or in authorising the building of railways, tramways or other infrastructure which could affect land valuations.

What is now known as a conflict of interest, seems not to have been considered an obstacle to political office. Some major figures in the land boom were also members of Parliament in Victoria.

Thomas Bent was elected to the Victorian Legislative Assembly for the district of Brighton, in 1871. He was Commissioner for Works and Railways in from 1881 to 1883, and used this position to extend the railway line from Caulfield to Cheltenham, thereby increasing the value of his own property developments. He was defeated at the election in September 1894. Later, he would be re-elected and become Premier of Victoria.

Matthew Henry Davies represented St Kilda in the Victorian Legislative Assembly from 1883 to 1889. He was a member of the Royal Commission on Transfer of Land and Titles to Land, in 1885, and, in 1887, was chairman of the Royal Commission on Banking. He was Speaker from 1890, until his resignation in April 1892. His elder brother, John Mark Davies, was a member of the Victorian Legislative Council from 1889 to 1919, and was Minister for Justice, when the Voluntary Liquidation Act was drafted and enacted.

Benjamin Fink was one of the two members representing the electorate of Maryborough and Talbot in the Victorian Legislative Assembly, from 1 February 1883 until 1 March 1889.

Charles Henry James represented Southern Province in the Victorian Legislative Council, from 1887 to 1890.

Andrew Lyell, later an early manager and director of Mercantile Finance, represented the electorate of Emerald Hill, in the Victorian Legislative Assembly, from 1877 to 1880. Unusually for a participant in the land boom, he left politics before the boom.

James Mirams was elected to the Victorian Legislative Assembly as the member for Collingwood in 1876, serving until 1886. He was subsequently the member for Williamstown from 1887 to 1889.

James Munro was elected to the Victorian Legislative Assembly, as one of two members for North Melbourne, in 1874. In 1877. He was elected for the new seat of Carlton, then for North Melbourne again in 1881, where he was defeated in 1883. In 1886, he was elected as one of the three members for Geelong, retaining his seat until he resigned in 1892. Munro was Premier of Victoria, from November 1890 until February 1892.

==== Railway construction ====
Thomas Bent was Commissioner for Works and Railways in from 1881 to 1883, and used this position to extend the railway line from Caulfield to Cheltenham, thereby increasing the value of his own property developments. After that, other scandals, and instances of nepotism, the Victorian Government appointed an English expert, Richard Speight, as Chief Commissioner to run the railways. The change was intended to remove political interference, by making the Railway Commissioners more independent, and was legislated as the Victorian Railway Commissioners Act, 1883.

After initially reforming the organisation, Speight allowed himself to become, as H.G. Turner put it, "a pliant instrument in the hands of cliques and schemers." In 1884, based upon Speight's recommendations, parliament passed what became known as the 'Octopus Act'—officially the Railway Construction Act 1884—covering construction of 65 new lines, totalling 1,170 miles, estimated to cost £44-million. It was accompanied by the Railway Loan Act, No. 760, which permitted the raising of a loan of £600,000 for construction of various lines.

One line constructed under the 'Octopus Act' made little sense, except to those promoting it. The Outer Circle railway line was constructed at a cost of £292,000, in part through largely empty land. Many land speculators, sensing an opportunity, bought land along its length. Construction began in 1888, at the height of the land boom. It was opened progressively from March 1890 to March 1891, but the railway was poorly patronised. With the line losing £24,000 per year, the first part of it closed, forever, in April 1893. Two remaining sections closed, in December 1895 and May 1897.

The privately-owned Rosstown Railway, was also constructed during 1883-1884. The line began near Elsternwick and ended at Oakleigh, and passed through some large land holdings owned by its proprietor, William Murray Ross (1825–1904). Although the line was completed, it never opened to paying passenger traffic. The government declined to buy it, mainly due to its substandard construction.

==== Royal Commission on Banking (1887) ====
In 1887, the Victorian Government held a Royal Commission into banking. It was chaired by Matthew Davies. The findings were influenced by the evidence of the banker, Edmund Samuel Parkes (1834-1887), who favoured laisez-faire policies. Parkes advocated removing restrictions on what security a bank could accept, but more frequent disclosures of their balance sheet. However, Parkes also recommended various means to protect banks and other financial institutions, from runs and other financial risks, which were not adopted. As an example, the commission recommended that banknotes issued by a bank should be a first charge on a bank's assets, in the event of a liquidation, but did not accept Parkes's position that a bank should set aside a sum of money used to guarantee its issued banknotes. The commission also considered a restriction on lending against the security of land to be unnecessary.

According to one report, critical of its outcomes, "The one object of this commission was to relieve all banks doing business in Victoria, whether chartered, incorporated by local act, or trading under the Companies' Act, of any prohibition from advancing money directly on mortgage. Without a special Act, any bank doing loan and mortgage business directly, instead of as collateral security, could not have obtained the use of trust moneys, for trustees were not empowered to lodge trust funds in any institution not recognised as a bank within the ordinary meaning of the term. The result of this alteration of banking law had the immediate effect of enormously increasing the advances on real estate."

=== Early years (1880 - 1887) ===
Engraving of a C.H. James land sale, at Fairfield, 1885 (State Library of Victoria)

Charles Henry James (1848–1898) is regarded as the first 'land boomer'. James and his brother-in-law, Percy Dobson, as partners, began to buy, subdivide and sell suburban real estate, around the end of the 1870s.

James opened the first tramway in Melbourne, in 1884. It was a horse tram and ran for two miles north along Station Street, Fairfield, linking Fairfield railway station to an otherwise inaccessible new sub-division. The land sold for good prices, and the tramway was short-lived. James had already sold around £3,000,000 worth of land, mainly in the northern and north-eastern suburbs of Melbourne, by 1887. The techniques that James applied were adopted by James's solicitor, Matthew Davies.

Around 1885, the established trading banks already had large exposures to loans secured by land. Those banks began to tighten credit, which should have cooled rising land values. Initially the value of land sales fell, from a total value of around £12 million, in 1885, to around £2¼ million in 1886 However, other changes soon brought about a resumption of the boom in land prices.

The outcome of the Royal Commission on Banking, in 1887, was to increase the available pool of funds for mortgage loans and loosen restrictions on lenders.

Building societies had long existed, providing modest levels of financing for home purchases and construction. The legislation covering these institutions allowed them to invest directly in land. Many building societies became involved in land speculation, using depositors funds, rather than housing finance.

Other entities known as 'land banks' were established, with the specific aim of lending for land purchases, or even directly investing in land and other properties. Banking laws were lax, with low barriers to entry and little regulation of banks' operations, facilitating the proliferation and growth of these new financial entities. The building societies and 'land banks' also offered attractive interest rates to depositors, and their depositors' funds fuelled increased lending. Significantly, most of the new land banks were closely connected to or effectively controlled by people who were heavily involved in land speculation, although most such institutions raised funds from investors and the public through the issue of shares.

The boom conditions were also accompanied by a rising share market, initially driven by mining stocks, which provided highly favourable conditions for company floats and capital raising. Moreover, the concept of a limited liability company was itself a relatively new one in Victoria—stemming from the gold mining companies of the 1850s—and the laws around such companies were immature and hence open to abuse.

Novice investors did not necessarily associate the high returns being seen, with a high risk of a loss. Seeing others becoming wealthy, seeming overnight, as land and property values and share prices climbed, many people joined the rush.

=== The speculative bubble inflates (1888) ===
Around 1887, the penultimate and most frenzied phase of the land boom began. It was exacerbated by the buoyant economy, booming stock market, the huge volume of funds brought into Victoria, in the form of British loans and investments, and the new land banks' lending practices.

==== Land speculation ====
In late 1888, the boom was being labelled "The Melbourne Land Boom", and remarkable increases in land values were reported. Land was being bought as a speculative investment, rather than for a buyer's own dwelling.

Engraving of a Munro & Baillieu land auction, 1889 (State Library of Victoria)

One land broker, in early August 1888, had made this bold claim, in a newspaper advertisement,"The marvellous Exchange of Freeholds, with the wonderful profits made thereon, have of late been startling in tho extreme. Fortunes have been made in a day, and are still being made, hence the question arises through commercial circles. when will the maximum be reached? The answer is comprised in two short words — NOT YET.

William Baillieu and his business partner Donald Munro—son of James Munro—opened a real estate agency and auctioneers business, Munro & Baillieu. It quickly became the largest real estate agency in Melbourne. The business made £168,000 profit, in the twelve months to October 1888. Much of that profit they invested in outer-suburban land and partly-paid shares in land companies, along with £100,000 that they borrowed and used to buy land.

==== The stock market ====
By the 1880s, the amount of gold produced in Victoria was actually in decline, but new mining ventures were listed, notably BHP with its Broken Hill silver-lead mine, in 1885. The stock market again began to boom. BHP shares rose from £9 in 1885 to £176 at Christmas 1887, then £223 in January 1888. On one day, 20 January 1888, around £2-million worth of shares, mainly BHP, changed hands.

In 1885, the Government of Victoria offered Melbourne Tramway and Omnibus Co. Ltd a 30-year exclusive contract to operate a tramway system. Its shares paid-up to 10s, were soon selling at 25s. In 1886, the price reached 36s, and 52s in 1888. In 1889, the company declared a 20% dividend, and the share price took off; it peaked at around £9. Having by then issued 900,000 shares, the company's capitalisation—effectively, part of the market value of the then semi-completed cable tramway network—reached £8,500,000. In fact, the company only owned the trams and held the 30 year operating concession. The tracks and winding houses were owned by Melbourne Tramway Trust, owned by twelve local governments. The company's shares had become a speculative play, with an inflated value.

In February 1888, the shares of Mercantile Finance had been selling at around £4 8s 6d. The price of the shares—paid up to £1 5s.—peaked at around £9 13s, in June 1888. In the same month, Mercantile Finance sought to raise £125,000 of new capital, as 100,000 new shares, at a premium of £625,000, totalling to £750,000, from its existing shareholders with an entitlement to buy one new share for every two shares held.

The stock market's capitalisation reached £50-million, in 1888, but by then the booming mining sector only accounted for £3.5-million. The land and finance sector was the largest, with a total capitalisation of £33-million. In the financial year ending in June 1888, at least 270 new companies were registered in Melbourne; these had a combined nominal capital of £50-million, paid up to £25-million.

===== New public companies =====
The final phase of the boom saw floats of many new companies, mainly, but not only, in the land and finance sectors, examples were:

- Austral Otis Elevator and Engineering Company - floated in November 1887
- Caledonian Land Bank Limited - floated in August 1888, a company associated with David Munro (1844–1898)
- City and Suburban Investment and Banking Company Limited - floated in August 1888 to buy land from G.W. Taylor
- Dominion Banking and Investment Corporation - floated in 1888, and controlled by Charles Henry James
- George and George Limited - an existing retailer, floated in April 1888
- McCracken's City Brewery Company Limited - floated in March 1888, a listing of a previously privately-owned brewery
- Mercantile Investment Trust - registered in June 1888, a short-lived investment company, with a large holding in Mercantile Finance
- Mortgage Debenture Corporation Limited - formed in November 1890
- Professional Chambers Company Limited - floated in August 1888, to develop an office building on a block in Collins Street, Melbourne
- Thomas Bent Land Company Limited - set up in 1888, to buy 95 acres of land at Ringwood, from Thomas Bent; it later collapsed

===== New quasi-private public companies =====
There were also new public companies, dominated by a small number of shareholders, but with enough shares held by associates to satisfy the legal requirements for a public company, and allow their shares to be listed on the stock exchange. These included:

- Bourke Street Freehold & Investment Company - registered in August 1888, shareholdings dominated by Fink, Munro and Baillieu families
- Maurice Aron and Company, Limited - registered on 24 April 1890, part of a near monopoly on furniture in Melbourne
- Wallachs Limited - registered on 24 April 1890, part of a near monopoly on furniture in Melbourne
- W. H. Rocke and Company, Limited - registered on 24 April 1890, part of a near monopoly on furniture in Melbourne

=== Warning signs ===
By 1889, land values had risen to such an extent that it was clear to many that a speculative bubble existed. Land was the security for the many loans, and the lending organisations were heavily exposed should land prices fall, as were the share prices of the 'land banks'. Commercial and residential property was also becoming an uneconomic as a 'geared' investment. Depositors expected a 6% return, but rental yields—compressed by overly high valuations—had fallen to 2.5%. The boom in commercial property too could not last. Land sales slowed and rents began to fall, indicating that the boom was peaking, but Melbourne land values did not reach their peak until 1891, perhaps causing some to ignore other signs of impending trouble.

Sourcing funds from London was becoming more difficult. During 1889, John McAlister Howden, made a visit to London to attempt to borrow funds there for Mercantile Finance and other companies under the control of Benjamin Fink. In a report to Melbourne he stated, "Australian matters and especially Melbourne interests were all under a cloud and every statement in connection with them were [sic] regarded with suspicion. Rumours were current about our company, which were even more exaggerated than in Melbourne."

Stocks related to land and property investments began to fall, and continued to fall. In the three years up to February 1892, the price of Mercantile Finance shares (paid-up to £2), fell in value from £9 10s to just 1s.

The economy slowed, particularly in areas associated with building. The large Hoffman Steam Brick Works at Brunswick had weekly sales of £3,000 in 1888, but in early 1890 that had fallen to £1,000.

In 1888, some large industrial disputes took place, as the rising trade union movement asserted its power, demanding higher wages and better conditions, mainly in the maritime and pastoral industries. However, the Melbourne tramways and iron workers were also involved in strikes that year. Strikes affected the New South Wales coal industry, upon which much of Australian industry and transport was then dependent. The coal miners' strike at Newcastle began in May 1888, and initially lasted nine weeks. After attempts to agree upon a settlement failed, there was a more widespread coal strike, beginning in August 1888. The strike lasted another nine weeks, before a settlement was at last agreed. The wider economy began to turn downward.

=== The struggle to survive ===
==== Land companies and banks owning land ====
In the final phase of the land boom, some major players and companies tried to hold on, by borrowing even more, rather than selling out at a loss, making their final indebtedness markedly worse. An example was Bourke Street Freehold & Investment Company, a company formed in August 1888, by prominent land boomers—Fink, Munro and Baillieu families—to buy a large city block, on Russell Street between Bourke and Little Collins Streets.

In a rising property market, the investment in commercial properties that had rental incomes had seemed sensible, but as values fell the companies owning property, such as Bourke Street Freehold & Investment Company, struggled to stay afloat, without selling the properties at a loss. In desperation, in 1891, that company mortgaged all its properties to a prominent Melbourne merchant, James Graham. That staved off insolvency, for a time, but it increased the interest due, to £7,000 annually. As businesses renting premises in the buildings closed down, due to the declining economy, the rental income fell further. In the end, the company would need to be liquidated. Shareholders would then became liable for unpaid calls on partly-paid shares, shares which were by then unwanted. In 1890, over half the calls were unpaid.

The Bourke Street Freehold & Investment Company seems to have had lax corporate governance, even by the standards of the time. An extraordinary meeting of the company, in 1890, sought to retrospectively legitimise past actions of its directors, by passing this bizarre resolution, "That the Company hereby ratifies confirms and adopts all and whatsoever the past or present Directors of the Company have, or any of them has done or purport to have done in connection with the affairs and business of the Company as appears in the Directors’ minute book and also ratifies confirms and adopts all other acts documents deeds matters things and transactions not appearing in such minute book, notwithstanding any defect or irregularity in the appointments of the Directors, or any of them, or that such appointment was or had become invalid, or that the office of the Directors, or any of them had become vacant and notwithstanding that any documents may have been or were executed without the previous consent or sanction of the Directors or a quorum thereof."

Others sought to offload overvalued land and property holdings to new investors, applying the 'greater fool theory'. An example was City and Suburban Investment and Banking Company Limited. it was set up around August 1888, to acquire large parcels of land—around 35,000 acres—from George William Taylor (1840–c.1920), a former mayor of Prahran. Shares were offered to the public. The broker was Mercantile Finance, and Taylor himself became a director. Shareholders paid up a total of £724,372 4s, but in April 1889, the company borrowed another £40,600, which would fall due for repayment in August 1892. The repayment was not made. By February 1893, unpaid shares and share calls left £348,131 of its supposed capital outstanding. Eventually, it would go into liquidation, in late 1893.

Another venture that offloaded overvalued land holdings was the British Bank of Australia (a.k.a. British Bank); it did so covertly. The company was relatively new having been formed in April 1888, as Victorian Freehold Bank Limited, but changed its name when it opened a London office in September 1889. Its early deposits were used to purchase land, by then already at high prices. Soon its main assets were suburban landholdings that it was finding increasingly hard to sell at auction. A new company, Anglo-Australian Investment & Banking Company Ltd (a.k.a. Anglo-Australian Bank) was formed, by some of the principals of the British Bank, and began taking deposits and investments in its shares, around July 1889. The new company set up a London office, with Lord Camoys and Hon. Ashley Ponsonby, as its London directors. It soon raised £100,000 in deposits from British investors. It then bought some virtually unsaleable land from the British Bank, for £90,000. It also bought, via dummy buyers, around half of the shares in British Bank, propping up that bank's share price. As both land and share prices fell, Anglo-Australian Bank obtained another £12,000 from the Mercantile Bank—secured by land at Footscray and British Bank shares—while its deposits ebbed away. It too would end up being liquidated. An advertisement for Anglo-Australian Bank, in April 1890 had stated, "By Its Articles of Association the Bank is prohibited from buying or dealing in freehold property, stocks, or shares of any kind whatever", yet it had had done both.

The Federal Bank of Australia, facing a similar predicament, was able transfer landholdings to Real Estate Bank, a company set up—by James Munro—specifically to buy that land.

==== Share price manipulation ====
===== Tramway company =====
The shares in Melbourne Tramway and Omnibus Co. Ltd had peaked at around £9, after the company had paid a 20% dividend. As the first signs of the end of boom appeared, the company's fare revenue and profits began to fall, rather than Increase. The share price began to fall. The company's directors started to buy shares on the market, in what proved to be an unsuccessful attempt to keep the share price from falling. The share price was only eight shillings, in mid 1892.

===== Mercantile Finance share issue (1888) =====
In May 1888, Mercantile Finance sought to raise £125,000 of new capital as 100,000 new shares—paid to £1 5s.—at a premium of £625,000, totalling to £750,000. Later, a liquidator's report noted that the number of on-market Mercantile Finance share transactions, in the 37 days preceding the share issue, was actually greater than the number of transactions in the previous 37 months. Moreover, most of the share purchases were in the names of officers and clerks of Mercantile Finance, which were later found to have been directed by either Benjamin Fink or John Howden. The liquidator was in no doubt that the transactions drew other unsuspecting investors to follow the apparent trend. While the liquidator was unable to find definitive proof of a share market manipulation, he also noted that that the issue price was three times greater than could be justified by the company's balance sheet, and that "the issue at that price would have been impossible but for the sudden extraordinary rise in the Stock Exchange prices". Further, not all the shares were issued against payments funded by purchasers; some of the new shares were paid by advances to purchasers, from the Mercantile Finance itself, which were not repaid, amounting to around £250,000. The price of the shares—paid up to £1 5s.—had peaked at around £9 13s, in June 1888.

Some companies resorted to paying dividends from capital. Others had dividends that were guaranteed to shareholders, and then paid using funds from other sources. A short-lived high rate of dividend could be used in 'ramping' a company's share price, as could artificially-induced trading in a company's shares. Both were true, in the case of Mercantile Finance.

=== Insolvency laws and 'secret compositions' ===
James Munro (1832–1908) was Premier of Victoria and, at the same time, a principal of the Federal Bank of Australia, the Federal Building Society, and the Real Estate Bank. Munro was a shareholder in ventures, with Benjamin Fink and his family as other shareholders, notably the Bourke Street Freehold and Investment Company. His son, Donald, was a partner of William (W.L) Baillieu, in Munro & Baillieu, a real estate agency. Munro pushed the Voluntary Liquidation Act through the Victorian Parliament, in December 1891, before having himself appointed Agent-General in London, and departing from Melbourne. The new legislation also applied to building societies as well as to individuals. John Mark Davies, elder brother of land boomer Matthew Henry Davies (1850—1912), was the Minister for Justice at the time, and said to be responsible for drafting the legislation.

A cartoonist's view of the operation of insolvency laws in Victoria in the wake of the crash. Note the bag labelled, 'Farthing in the Pound', a reference to Benjamin Fink's insolvency. Punch (Melbourne), 8 March 1894.

A debtor could propose a 'composition' to satisfy all debtor's obligations to them, without insolvency proceedings or appointment of a trustee in bankruptcy. The composition had to be registered with the Insolvency Court, but otherwise only need be made known to the debtor and the creditors. These were the infamous 'secret compositions'—more correctly, ‘composition by arrangement’—by which land boomers avoided both public scrutiny of their financial predicament and the stigma of a formal bankruptcy. 'Secret compositions' had been possible before the 1891 legislation, but the legislation made it harder for minority creditors to compulsorily wind up the estate of an insolvent.

An insolvent debtor needed to first call a meeting of their creditors, and present to the meeting a proposed arrangement to discharge the debt—typically via a discounted repayment—as a resolution to be put to a vote. A 75% majority of creditors accepting the arrangement was binding on all creditors, subject to confirmation at a second creditors' meeting. Once such a composition was deposited with the clerk of the Insolvency Court, a certificate discharging the debt would be issued.

Although only a relatively small fraction of insolvencies made use of 'secret compositions', the amounts involved were generally the larger ones. Moreover, the 'secret composition' was susceptible to abuse, particularly when the identities of the true creditors might be hidden, by various financial structures perhaps involving parties financially related to or effectively controlled by the debtor. W.L. Baillieu and the two Munro brothers all presented 'secret compositions' on the same day in 1892.

The lack of scrutiny also allowed some latitude for debtors to omit from consideration certain assets that they held personally, or to shift assets to the names of relatives or associates. Once the certificate discharging the debt had been issued, the ex-debtors were free to rebuild their fortunes, and some later did just that, including Benjamin Fink, his brother Theodore Fink, and W.L. Baillieu.

The secrecy over details of debts and assets also suited some of the creditors, particularly banks who had a large exposure to the debtor. The banks' true exposures would not emerge, until some banks began to fail during 1893. A large loan to Benjamin Fink was helpfully written off by the City of Melbourne Bank, probably to prevent it becoming known that the bank itself was, by then, hopelessly insolvent. A loan from Federal Bank to W.L. Baillieu had also conveniently written off by the bank, and did not appear as a debt in his 'secret composition'.

The 'secret composition' was open to abuse by both debtors and creditors, and a means to conceal rather than to reveal. As an article in Table Talk of June 1893 put it. "It is but a few years ago that even in Victoria honourable merchants were anxious, when under stress of circumstances they were driven to insolvency, to be examined before the court so as to explain on oath how they had managed their affairs. How is it that now the thing a "boomer" most dreads is publicity and an examination in insolvency?"

=== Winding up companies ===
The Companies Act, as it existed at the time, imposed few constraints on the voluntary liquidation of a company. While shareholders had nominal control of the process, the liquidators in a voluntary winding up could be officers or directors of the company, and often were. Such company officers and directors of failed companies had a conflict of interest, in that they could use their role as liquidators to conceal aspects of the company's affairs that revealed them as culpable or could otherwise attract criticism. At the end of the voluntary liquidation, the liquidator was allowed to destroy all company records. It was a process open to abuse, during the flood of liquidations that followed the peak of the land boom.

Many of the failed companies were relatively new and shares were only partly paid. Unpaid calls on shares, were called up on when companies were being liquidated. However, some major shareholders avoided liabilities for unpaid calls by transferring nominal ownership of their shares into the names of dummy owners.

Another issue was that although a company may hold the title to land or other properties and shares, those 'assets' may have been mortgaged to some other entity, leaving the company as a worthless shell.

=== The first failures ===
In December 1889, Premier Permanent Building Society suspended payments to depositors and closed its doors. There were allegations of gross mismanagement, later culminating in criminal convictions. It had lent more than three times its paid up capital and used its own loans as security. This society's secretary was James Mirams, who was among the first land boomers to have a 'liquidation by arrangement', in March 1890, paying his creditors just 2d. in the pound.

David Munro (1844–1898), a wealthy engineer, contractor, and manufacturer of machinery, was another of the 'land boomers' to declare his personal insolvency, in April 1890. As a contractor, Munro had built two fine bridges across the Yarra River—Princes Bridge and Queens Bridge—and two railway lines. Plunging into land speculation, he had taken large loans from banks to purchase land for subdivision. Using his wife's name, Munro had borrowed further large amounts from Benjamin Fink's Mercantile Finance, which he had also used to speculate in land. He had floated a 'land bank', Caledonian Land Bank Ltd, but some of its shareholders accused him of selling his properties, at Brighton and Canterbury, into the float of that company, at inflated valuations, leading to demands that Munro buy their shares. His business David Munro and Co. Limited had a large overdraft from the City of Melbourne Bank. The bank insisted that Munro hand over the management of his hitherto successful business, thereby damaging its performance. That led to a call on the shares, which he could not meet. Having run out of options, he declared insolvency, as did his wife. In 1898, Munro died, in greatly reduced circumstances, of a haemorrhage and his, by then, chronic alcoholism.

== The crash and its aftermath ==
It was not until the years from 1891 to 1893 that the full consequences of the excesses of the boom became apparent, through the successive financial failures of multiple 'land boomers', their various corporate structures, and ultimately some banks. The massive destruction of wealth also affected the general economy, making matters worse; businesses closed, and ceased to pay rents, depositors lost their savings, and workers lost their jobs.

The final trigger of the inevitable crash came in the form of the Baring crisis of November 1890. It related to loans made by Barings Bank to the far away country of Argentina. Argentina defaulted on loans of nearly £48,000,000 during 1890. British bankers and investors with loans to Australian banks and other financial institutions feared a repeat of the Argentinean circumstances in Australia. British funding dried up, and with it the means by which some of the land boom entities were hanging on.

=== Collapse of property values and rental income ===
Land values had fallen by the end of 1891—both for suburban land and land within the city itself—and, even at lower prices, land became difficult to sell. Those with geared investments in land and buildings faced ruin. One such was T.P. Fallon, who had bought a site on Collins Street, and then built a large office block on it. Completed by the end of 1891, not one office space in the new building was rented. After receiving a letter from the Colonial Bank, Fallon committed suicide, on 4 January 1892.

=== Bank and building society failures ===
==== Early 'land bank' failures ====
The first of the 'land banks' to fail was the Imperial Banking Company Limited. Nearly £200,000 was lost in its collapse. It had been floated in 1886, by Sir Benjamin Benjamin (1834–1905), Lord Mayor of Melbourne. It began life making advances for land sales, but its articles of association were later amended, to allow it to buy, hold, and sell land on its own account. The bank suspended payments on 24 July 1891. Benjamin, with others, was subject to a court inquiry into the bank's failure; it cleared him of culpability, finding that mismanagement by others was to blame. However, the inquiry made it impossible for Benjamin to avoid formal bankruptcy. It ended his public life, but in the process earned him some public respect and sympathy.

John Bellin was the manager of the Greater Mutual Investment and Building Society, from 1881. Bellin began to dip into the society's funds for his own purposes, but nothing was noticed, and he continued to be regarded as an upright businessman. In 1888, he joined forces with John Turner and James Hobson Turner—who had involvement in speculative ventures with Benjamin Fink—and the three set up Fourth Industrial Building Society. Due to Bellin's hitherto good reputation, the new society received deposits from the public. These were then misappropriated by Bellin and his associates. Worse, some money given to Bellin to invest in accounts of the building society was taken before it was even deposited. By mid-1890, his personal debts were around £70,000, most of it tied up as land. Once he was made bankrupt, the two building societies were also investigated and the widespread misappropriation was uncovered. Some of the directors were aware of the land purchases and loans to Bellin, but had thought that Bellin was buying land on behalf of the society, not in his own name. It was later revealed—after the building societies were in liquidation—that the loans that Greater Mutual had made to Bellin were not recorded in any of the daily cash book, general cash book, journal, or general ledger.

The British Bank of Australia (British Bank) and its associated company, Anglo-Australian Investment & Banking Co. (Anglo-Australian Bank), both suspended payments during August 1891. At the time, Anglo-Australian Bank blamed its demise on the slightly earlier suspension by the British Bank, but Anglo-Australian Bank's situation was complicated by later to be revealed fraud and mismanagement.

Another 'land bank', the Land Credit Bank, suspended payments on 1 December 1891. Multiple instances of fraud, perpetrated by its manager, George Nicholson Taylor, were uncovered soon afterwards. Just days later, on 4 December 1891, The Metropolitan Bank and Building Society (a.k.a. Metropolitan Bank) and the Standard Bank of Australia (a.k.a. Standard Bank) had suspended payments. Standard Bank formerly had been known as Australian Freehold Banking Corporation, but in January 1890 it had changed it name; "The reason assigned for a change of name was that it would remove the "misconception" in the minds of British depositors who associated the title "Freehold Bank" with land speculation."

The Mercantile Bank of Australia closed on 5 March 1892; its financial position had been undermined by fraud and large loans to its own directors.

==== Associated Banks of Victoria ====
The largest of the trading banks were members of an industry body known as the Associated Banks of Victoria, established in 1877. None of the Australian colonies had a central bank. Instead, in Victoria, three of the functions of a central bank were carried out by the Associated Banks, either jointly or individually. First, the selling of bonds and debentures on behalf of the government was handled by the Associated Banks. Second, the issue of banknotes, was done by individual banks in the group. While their banknotes were not legal tender, the notes were fully-convertible to coin, and in effect guaranteed by the bank concerned. Third, another function of a central bank is to provide liquidity, as a lender of last resort, during a financial crisis. A distinction could be drawn between the situation a bank being illiquid and it being insolvent. As a combination of the second and third of these roles—banknote issuer and lender of last resort—the banks also could continue to honour the banknotes issued by a member bank facing difficulties.

In December 1891, Standard Bank and Metropolitan Bank—as trading banks—applied for assistance from the Associated Banks, but that did not eventuate. The Metropolitan Bank's application was still being considered, when it suspended payments, and the Standard Bank was in a hopeless financial situation. The next test came with the failure of the Mercantile Bank; in that case the bank refused to allow an inspection of its books, and assistance was refused. So, up to March 1892, three banks had failed and the supposed mutual backing of the Associated Banks had not been applied; that in itself affected confidence in the remaining trading banks.

In the years before the 1893 crisis, the Associated Banks had taken two steps to prepare against the failure of any of its members. First, seeing the potential for conflicts of interest, in 1889, they introduced a regulation excluding any member banks that had an interest in a building society. Its smallest and weakest member, Federal Bank of Australia, then sold 130,000 shares that it owned in the Federal Building Society. However, some banks did maintain an association—via their directors and provenance of their companies—with building societies, and some banks had made loans to building societies. Second, in mid March 1892, the Associated Banks made a public statement that the member banks, "have agreed to act unitedly in rendering financial assistance to each other, should such be required; and that the Government of Victoria have resolved to afford their cordial co-operation".

==== The 1893 bank crisis ====
At the end of January 1893, Federal Bank of Australia suspended payment. It was controlled by James Munro, and was the first large bank, as opposed to 'land bank', that failed. The Federal Bank was the smallest and weakest of the Associated Banks, and the organisation chose not to support the Federal Bank. One factor in that decision was a belief, held by the Anglo-Australian bank members of the Associated Banks, that the organisation should not be seen trying to cover up the insolvency of the Federal Bank.

Using the laws of the time, the Federal Bank entered a voluntary liquidation, with the shareholders appointing its own manager, Alfred Priestley as its liquidator. A small creditor immediately attempted to force a compulsory liquidation, but was not successful in doing so.

Failures of trading banks carried consequences beyond those affecting depositors and shareholders. Colonial governments did not issue banknotes; these were issued mainly by the privately-owned banks, and even by some businesses. Although these notes were not legal tender, at the time, the notes served as a medium of exchange, effectively guaranteed by the issuing entity. Redeeming banknotes for coin, placed a strain on a bank's finances. Moreover, in the event of a bank being liquidated, any of its banknotes left in circulation became an additional liability.

As confidence in the banking system fell—not assisted by the public disavowal of the Federal Bank, by the Associated Banks— banknotes were redeemed for coin, and deposits reduced. Other banks in a weak position became vulnerable. Commercial Bank of Australia, which had been the fastest growing bank in Victoria, had lent money to building societies. Its deposits were draining way. The three largest banks—Union Bank of Australia, Bank of Australasia, and Bank of New South Wales—considered a joint action to lower their interest rates or to limit the size of their own new deposits, both intended to assist Commercial Bank hold its deposits. It suspended payments on 5 April 1893. Within six weeks, thirteen of Australia’s twenty-two trading banks had suspended payments.

When the next phase of the banking crisis began, in early May 1893, the matter of dealing with the Commercial Bank failure was still in the courts, who were considering a petition to wind up the Commercial Bank, and liquidate its remaining assets. A shareholders and creditors meeting, on 24 April 1893, had passed a motion to reconstruct the bank. Some—including George Meudell—have argued that the bank should not have been allowed to be reconstructed, as it was—and remained for some period afterwards—insolvent, but the court found itself bound by the new legislation. Vast amounts of new capital would be needed, but the Commercial Bank survived to be reconstructed.

The National Bank of Australasia—the largest bank in Victoria—had been well-managed and had not taken on loans to risky ventures, but it too began to be affected. Such was the decline in its deposits that, over the weekend of 29-30 April 1893, the bank informed the Premier, privately, that it intended to suspend its operation, on Monday 1 May 1893. Cabinet met in an emergency session, on Sunday 30 April 1893, a proclamation was hurriedly drafted, and a special train took it to Frankston, for signature by the Acting Governor. The train returned with the signed proclamation, in time for news of it to be printed in the Monday morning newspapers.

The Colonial Government of Victoria declared the week from Monday 1 May to 5 May 1893, as bank holidays, which kept banks closed. A stated purpose was to allow fragile banks to have some time to come up with plans for financial reconstruction or amalgamation, but some banks just suspended payment immediately. Another factor driving some banks to suspend payments around then was the anticipated withdrawal of British deposits—around 40% of total deposits—with a large amount falling due, at the end of the Scottish Whitsun term, in mid-May 1893.

The sudden and unexpected bank holidays, leaving people unable to access their deposits, did not help in what was a crisis of public confidence. Two banks, the Union Bank of Australia and the Bank of Australasia, defied the bank holiday and remained open, and runs on them quickly subsided. Other banks, particularly those with branches in other colonies, such as the Bank of New South Wales, reopened after a short closure, mainly for fear of inducing runs in other Australian colonies.

Facing up to the April-May 1893 crisis, the Associated Banks of Victoria did act to support affected member banks. Banks continued to honour the banknotes of other member banks that had suspended payment. Longer term, plans for financial reconstruction would be implemented. Commercial Bank was able to reopen on 6 May 1893.

In the wake of the 'bank holiday' episode came news, from London, that orders had been granted for compulsorily winding up five Australian banks that had already suspended payment—Commercial Bunking Company of Sydney, Standard Bank of Australia (before 1890, Australian Freehold Banking Corporation), National Bank of Australasia, The Australian Joint Stock Bank, and City of Melbourne Bank—but that the receivers would not take action, without the prior sanction of the courts. All five of the above banks survived the immediate crisis, but two—Standard Bank (no longer trading) and City of Melbourne Bank—would be in the hands of their creditors within years.

The relevant legislation changed, in December 1893, when the Victorian Parliament had passed the Companies Act Amendment Act; it facilitated a court sanctioned compromise on debts or reconstruction—based on the simple test that such a path would be of benefit to a majority of creditors—as an alternative to liquidation. The new legislation made a reconstruction more likely than a liquidation, provided that 75% or more of creditors favoured it, and their decision was made with adequate knowledge of the company's financial position. Complementary legislation was passed in New South Wales and Queensland, which allowed the creditors of largely British-controlled banks that operated in more than one colony to make a choice between reconstruction and liquidation.

One of the banks that suspended payments in May 1893 was City of Melbourne Bank. The bank reopened, after just 17 days, pending a capital reconstruction. However, although not revealed at the time, the bank had given large loans, with inadequate security, and the bank's books did not reveal the extent of its true exposure.

=== The financial scandals ===
==== Benjamin Fink's failure ====
As one of the largest players in the land boom, it seemed inevitable that Benjamin Fink would be affected by the crash. If Fink became insolvent, many others would be affected. There were guarantees that Fink had given, personally, for loans taken out by various companies and syndicates through which he had bought properties and other assets. The number and complexity of his financial arrangements, loans, and guarantees, made an understanding of his true position difficult. Reports that Benjamin Fink had called a meeting of his creditors, in September 1892, were generally reported as causing relief.

Together Fink's partly-secured and unsecured debtors faced a combined stated deficiency of £1,019,275. The news, in October 1892, that a majority of his creditors had agreed to accept just a halfpenny in the pound on that amount—just £2,123 10s—was reported, "naturally to have startled the whole business community". Fink made use of a 'secret composition', in September 1892. He subsequently left Melbourne and moved to London, he apparently did not visit Melbourne again until 1896.

At the time of Fink's 'secret composition', it was not known that there was in fact around another £310,000 owed by Fink to the City Bank of Melbourne. That loan was helpfully written off by the bank, in secret, probably to prevent it becoming known that the bank itself was, by then, itself facing insolvency.

==== Mercantile Finance ====
In July 1892, shareholders of what had been Benjamin Fink's principal company, Mercantile Finance—officially, The Mercantile, Finance, Trustees and Agency Company of Australia Limited—were told that although calls on shares would be needed, "there was every prospect of this company, meeting all its engagements and having a balance left for shareholders". By that time, Fink was no longer a director of the company; and not even recorded as a major shareholder.

Mercantile Finance suspended payment, in July 1893. It was put into liquidation. Damage done to financial institutions that had accepted guarantees, from Mercantile Finance—as a security for loans to other parties—also began to become apparent.

The liquidators report was released in September 1894. It listed many instances of questionable conduct. Regarding the company's failure in July 1893, it stated that' "The immediate causes of the suspension of the company appear to have been, first the financial crisis of December 1891; second, the crisis of March and April 1893; third, the failure of a large portion of shareholders to pay the calls made by directors; but the main causes were the extravagantly large advances made and the guarantees issued, both without sufficient security, during 1887 and 1888."

The liquidator's report examined the enormous profit of 1888, finding that some of it was bogus. It also identified some aspects of a capital raising in May 1892, which hinted at share price manipulation leading up to the issue, and it noted that an excessive premium had been applied to new shares. The liquidators findings included, "As showing the dominant influence alleged to have been exercised by Mr. B. J. Fink in the management of the company, and the use to which it was occasionally put, the liquidators find that especially favourable rates for guarantees in favour of that gentleman were obtained." The liquidator was also critical of the role of the company's secretary, John McAlister Howden, finding that he and Fink cooperated in some transactions that were 'objectionable'.

It took until April 1900 to complete the liquidation of Mercantile Finance. By then, £166,372 2s. 2d. had been received from calls on the company's shares and £38,012 12s. 3d. from asset sales. After deducting the cost of the liquidation and other charges, the seven dividends paid to creditors totalled £179,509 12s. 5d. They had been paid 3s. 4d. in the pound, or more precisely, 3s. 3 and 49/50d.

==== Matthew Davies and his companies ====
Matthew Henry Davies, was a major land speculator and former speaker of the Victorian Parliament. Within six months of the passing of the Voluntary Liquidation Act of December 1891, almost all of Davies' companies had been liquidated, by their own directors. His liquidators had a list of no less than thirty-four companies.

His Freehold Investment Company Ltd had paid an 8% dividend, in October 1891, but closed three months afterwards. The bank that Davies and his associates controlled, Mercantile Bank of Australia, had suspended payments in March 1892. Following his return from London, Graham Berry remained a director of that bank, and continued to be one after he became Treasurer. Mercantile Bank was exposed in the weekly magazine, Table Talk, as having carried out some highly questionable transactions in the lead up to its collapse. In February 1892, a month before the bank suspended payments, Berry had said, "A good institution has been established, and it is for shareholders to act like men and not run away like children". A fellow director stated that, "The rumours about the bank that have been circulated are entirely unfounded". Later, evidence showed that some directors had seen an internal document showing losses, up to that time, of £830,000, and that the bank had borrowed £100,000 from another bank, and, it was alleged, used that money to pay an 8% dividend, shortly before closing down. A promissory note for £20,000, from the Premier, James Munro, had been discounted by the bank, just before the bank had closed its doors, and Munro had moved to London as Agent-General. Table Talk advocated that the directors should be prosecuted.

Unable to make use of the 'secret composition' process, due to being absent from Victoria for a time, Davies was made bankrupt by his creditors. His personal deficiency was £248,376, but his companies had lost over £4,000,000 of the public's money. Davies's brother, Joseph Bartlett Davies (1843–1924)—managing director of Davies's company Freehold Investment and Banking Co. Ltd—went bankrupt in April 1894; his debts totalled £594,000, but he paid his creditors just ¼ d in the pound.

==== Federal Bank ====
The Federal Bank of Australia (a.k.a. Federal Bank) was in the process of voluntary liquidation, when two articles about the bank appeared in Table Talk, in June 1893. The first article provided a detailed view of the bank's affairs, and those of two other associated companies, Real Estate Bank and Federal Building Society. The second article stated that depositors and other creditors were dissatisfied with the voluntary liquidation, particularly that former officers of the companies were overseeing the liquidation.

The English depositors of Federal Bank had appointed a lawyer, William Riggall as their Melbourne representative; at first he had trusted the financial details provided by the liquidator. After seeing the first Table Talk article, he approached the liquidator, Alfred Priestley—former manager of Federal Bank—and asked him if the figures in the Table Talk article were correct. He was told that the figures were 'substantially correct'. Riggall then prevailed upon Priestley to give him the correct details of the overdrafts on the bank, and took action in court to remove Priestley as liquidator. The legal fight to remove Priestley would still be in progress a year later in April 1894, when another scathing article appeared in Table Talk, but the court appearances by then had already exposed much misconduct at the bank. Eventually, R.E. Jacomb would take the role of liquidator.

It soon emerged that the Federal Bank had made huge loans to related parties; over £270,000 to Munro and his immediate family; £230,000 to William Bailiieu and the partnership of Munro & Baillieu; and close to £240,000 to four directors of the bank (William McLean, John Whittingham, John Robb, and Edward Latham). In total, the loans to Munro, his family, and his associates came to nearly three quarters of a million pounds.

Then there was the manner in which the loans were secured and recorded. For example, a loan to Baillieu was guaranteed by Munro, and a loan to Munro was guaranteed by Baillieu. This arrangement was described by Isaac Isaacs as, "the farce of advancing to A on B's guarantee, and to B on A's guarantee". Baillieu's guarantee had been accepted for a loan to Munro & Baillieu. Munro & Baillieu guaranteed three accounts in the name of a Mr Hall, a solicitor's clerk, as a means of concealing that the three accounts were actually for Munro & Baillieu and that the partnership had been the guarantor for its own accounts. Munro had multiple accounts, in the names of various companies, which helped to hide the extent of the bank's exposure to him. A loan from Federal Bank to W.L. Baillieu had not even appeared as a debt in his 'secret composition, having been conveniently written off by the bank, probably to prevent an exposure of the bank's own precarious position.

There was little prospect of recovering most of the money from the major debtors. Munro had been made bankrupt in February 1893. William Baillieu had made a 'secret composition' in July 1892, and had been released from his debts, for 6d. in the pound. William McLean was made bankrupt in 1894. Edward Latham made a 'secret composition' in 1892, and was genuinely broke. John Robb became insolvent in October 1894, repaying 1s. 6d. in the pound. As the participants became either insolvent or were released from debt by a 'secret composition', their various personal loan guarantees became worthless.

The directors had also used the bank's funds to buy its own shares, as a way of countering the fall in its share price. Investigations into trading in the company's shares by directors—using dummy buyers' names—and the associated share price manipulation, would still be ongoing, in 1895.

After the bank was referred to the Insolvency Court, in November 1894, William McLean, a director, gave evidence on how directors' accounts were kept in credit when the books were balanced. As the balance date approached, he would draw a cheque for £25,000 on the City of Melbourne Bank, and deposit it in his account at Federal Bank. Once the auditors recorded that he was a creditor, he would write a check and pay back £25,000 to the City of Melbourne Bank. Accusations of arrangements of this kind had been made earlier, in the Table Talk article of April 1894.

Directors of the bank and ex-manager Priestley tried to put the blame on the assistant manager, Pinnock, who had conveniently decamped to South Africa. Nobody would face charges in relation to the misconduct at the Federal Bank.

By October 1896, the liquidation had returned dividends totalling 7s. 6d. in the pound, with the final amount expected to be 9s. 6d. or even more.

In 1900, over 30,000 of the Federal Bank's redeemed banknotes were burned by order of the liquidator on the advice of a judge. Surviving specimen banknotes now sell for hundreds of times their original face value.

==== City of Melbourne Bank ====
The bank had been attempting a capital reconstruction, since May 1893. An amended reconstruction scheme was rejected by British shareholders. At 11 a.m. morning of 7 August 1895, the bank suspended payment. Directors immediately submitted petitions to have the bank's business wound up, voluntarily. Directors noted a loss, in the half year to March 1895 of £13,366, and that reduced property values would necessitate a write down in the bank's capital. However, the affairs of the bank were in a far worse financial position than they stated.

British creditors sought to have a compulsory winding up of the bank. They succeeded in obtaining such an order, in late August 1895. That had the effect of keeping the liquidation out of the hands of the directors.

A court case, in 1896, would reveal the enormous loans that the bank had made, to just three customers—Benjamin Fink (£312,865), David Munro and Co. (£401,383), and Fergusson and Mitchell (£235,181)—in total £949,429, while the bank's capital was just £500,000. None of that money would be recovered.

==== Anglo-Australian Bank and British Bank ====
A compulsory liquidation of the Anglo-Australian Bank was ordered in August 1891, on the petition of a creditor, leaving the bank's books open to a proper examination. The bank actually owed some £300,000 on land that it had bought, when it had advertised that it was prohibited by its articles of association from dealing in land. Charles Staples, the bank's chairman, and John Haroldson, its manager, fled from Melbourne.

The work of the liquidator John Templeton, an actuary and former manager of National Mutual, revealed more. The bank had publicised its paid up capital as being £110,000, when only £37 10s had been paid up. The bank had paid £40,000 in dividends, mainly to its directors over three years. The directors had received around £100,000 in cash, including a £70,000 overdraft, backed by now worthless British Bank shares. The liquidator's final report was delivered in May 1907; the liquidator stated that upon his appointment, he had found the bank to be "a sham and a swindle." In the liquidation, depositors received just 3d. in the pound.

The liquidation of the British Bank was still underway in 1905, but had seemed about a year from completion. In 1909, the liquidator finally reached agreement with Wyndham shire, over rates in arrears on 900 blocks of land at Laverton—some of it swampland—that the bank had not been able to sell during the land boom.

==== Later 'land bank' failures ====
Some land banks avoided liquidation for a time. One was the Dominion Banking and Investment Corporation—a.k.a. Dominion Bank—which was associated with Charles Henry James. It voted for voluntary liquidation in December 1895, a decision sanctioned by a court in 1896.

==== Other failures and 'secret compositions' ====
Benjamin Fink's brother, Theodore Fink , arranged numerous 'secret compositions' for land boom figures, but also was the subject of two of his own, in January and July 1892. Wolfe Fink had one in July 1892, and another of Fink's brother, Marc (or Mark) Fink, followed the same process in October 1892. Others to make 'secret compositions' were associates of Fink in various ventures, W. L. Baillieu, James Mirams, one the first in March 1890, and Andrew Lyell, another early one, in October 1890.

Inevitably, details or rumoured details of the 'secret compositions' became known to the press, and hence the public. Benjamin Fink's 'secret composition' was reported as being only a farthing in the pound, earning him, the nickname 'Farthing Fink', and resulted in legal proceedings. The eventual outcome was an improvement for his creditors, but only to a halfpenny in the pound.

In his book The Land Boomers, Michael Cannon provided lists of 'secret compositions', for the years 1892 and 1893; the lists show 85 in 1892 and 52 in 1893, but omit some known 'secret compositions' and thus must somewhat understate the actual numbers.

The massive write offs adversely impacted public confidence. Even secured creditors faced significant losses, as values of property and shares that had been pledged as security only continued to fall in value, after being repossessed.

Among the last of the prominent land boomers to become formally bankrupt were Charles James and Benjamin Fink. James paid his creditors just 6¾d. in the pound, on a debt of £851,842, in 1897. He died the following year. Benjamin Fink, had escaped bankruptcy via a 'secret composition' in October 1892. He was made bankrupt, with debts of £135,288, in London in 1902. The debt arose from a receiving order to pay calls on shares in McCracken's Brewery Company—amounting to £126,000—and, reportedly, the adverse impact of the Australian drought. Fink was issued with a certificate discharging his bankruptcy, in January 1903, "upon payment of a nominal sum", £100, significantly less than a farthing in the pound.

==== Prosecutions, acquittals, and convictions ====
James Mirams had one year in prison over the Premier Building Society of which he was secretary. Passing sentence, in 1890, Chief Justice George Higinbotham found Mirams to be unrepentant, stating, "you are in the position of a man who will not look at the facts, and who is determined not to consider that it may be possible that he has done wrong'".

George Nicholson Taylor, manager of the Land Credit Bank was convicted of fraud in February 1892. He received a 10 year sentence, and was released in 1899. In March 1892, Matthius Larkin (ex-secretary) and Patrick Cleary (accountant) were found guilty of conspiring to defraud South Melbourne Building Society. Larkin was sentenced to six years hard labour and Cleary to four. In August 1894, Larkin was again on trial, this time for stealing a cheque from South Melbourne Building Society.

Joh Bellin manager of the Greater Mutual Investment and Building Society and Fourth Industrial Building Society, was charged with stealing money, before it had been deposited into customers' accounts. Pleading guilty, he was sentenced to five years in prison, in September 1890. Overcome with shame, his daughter had committed suicide on the eve of Bellin's arrest. He died in prison in March 1892.

Initially, the Victorian Government did not pursue to the directors of the Anglo-Australian Bank. Outrage at this inaction, led to the government conceding that they would act if a complaint was made. A warder at Pentridge Gaol, who had lost life savings of £900, John Hogan, raised his complaint with a Melbourne newspaper, Evening Standard, forcing the government finally to act. In November 1892, Charles Staples, chairman, and John Haroldson, the bank's manager, were found and taken into custody, in Sydney where they had been living for over eight months. Staples later claimed that he had been to San Francisco, but returned when he heard that the bank was in trouble.

In March 1893, Staples, Haroldson, two directors—Robert Dilly and Sydney Allright—and the auditor Francis Norwood, went to trial on eighteen counts of issuing a false report and balance sheet with intent to defraud, before Justice Joseph Henry Hood and a jury. All were found guilty; Staples on all eighteen counts, Dilly and Allright on fifteen counts, Haroldson on twelve, and Norwood on three counts. The jury drew attention to the youth and inexperience of Haroldson and Allright, recommending that mercy be shown.

Staples received a sentence of up to five years, but the judge said that that sentence had been constrained by the offence being classed, by the Victorian legislature, as a misdemeanour rather than a felony. Haroldson received six months with hard labour; while not benefiting from the fraud, he was found to have concurred in a criminal practice. Norwood, the auditor, received two years. Dilly received two years with hard labour, as a result of his role in offloading the British Bank's land to the Anglo-Australian Bank. Allright, a farmer turned bank director, who had not understood what had been going on, was fined £100.

Charles Staples was already serving his sentence, when, in April 1893, the government decided to proceed against him again, in relation to his role as chairman of the British Bank. However, there seems to have been no second trial. Staples was released, after serving three years. In February 1896, after his release, he entered insolvency, with debts of £415,323, and a deficiency of £220,544.

In February 1894, Joseph Johnson, secretary of the Melbourne Permanent Building Society pleaded guilty to three counts of embezzlement. He was sentenced to two years imprisonment.

Matthew Henry Davies, a major land speculator and former speaker of the Victorian Parliament, was prosecuted for conspiracy to defraud at the insistence of the Solicitor-General, Isaac Issacs. In September 1893, he and some others associated with the Mercantile Bank, were committed for trial for having "with intent to defraud, unlawfully published a statement and account called 'Directors' report and balance-sheet on 1st February, 1892,' well knowing it to be false". In March 1894, after Justice Hood's summing up—it very much favoured the defence—the defendants were found not guilty, in a Supreme Court jury trial.

On 24 August 1896, four directors of the City of Melbourne Bank—Thomas Loader, James Williamson, J.L. Roberts, and Jenkyn Collier—and two auditors—Andrew Burns and J.B. McQuie—were committed for trial, charged with concurring to issue two false balance sheets, in 1892 and 1893. It was alleged that the bank had paid £45,000 in dividends, while insolvent. Their trial began, before Justice Edward Dundas Holroyd and a jury, on 21 September 1896.

After the evidence had been given, Justice Holroyd gave his summing up, over two days. It seemed overall to favour the defence's position by blaming deceased bank manager Colin Longmuir and director Benjanin Fink—by then living in England—for the fraud. The jury returned a verdict of not guilty. An attempt by the jury foreman to add a rider to the verdict that the directors had been negligent in their duties was ruled out of order by the judge, and the accused were discharged.

On day following the verdict in the City of Melbourne Bank trial, The Age opined that. "Clearly the public have little or no protection against the most palpable frauds ... The City Bank trial and its revelations will sink deep into the minds of the people and accentuate the demand everywhere made for a radical amendment of the law under which such gross doings have been possible."

=== Economic depression ===
Land and building values in Melbourne and its suburbs plunged in the aftermath of the crash, with many properties left in the hands of a mortgagee, often themselves facing financial ruin. Examples exist of land values falling by as little as 50% and as much as 75%. In Melbourne, house prices kept falling, until reaching 63% of the 1891 peak, in 1903. It took until 1917 for house prices to recover to 1891 levels.

Those few with ready cash could buy city buildings well below their boom prices. However, for depositors and investors, the losses were real, and many lost their savings, in a massive destruction of wealth. Workers in the formerly buoyant economy lost their jobs and incomes.

The economy slowed, particularly in areas associated with building. The large Hoffman Steam Brick Works at Brunswick, which had weekly sales of £3,000 in 1888, and a sharply lower £1,000 in early 1890, saw its weekly sales collapse to £300 to £400 in 1891, and bottom at £50 to £60, in 1893.

Although, during the 1890s, Australia as a whole experienced an economic depression—real GDP fell by 17% in 1892 and 1893— it was worse and longer lasting in Victoria. The population of Greater Melbourne actually declined, from 490,000 to 458,000, during the years from 1891 to 1897, as many sought opportunities elsewhere.

The Victorian Government imposed an additional import duty in 1893, probably due to collapse in other revenues. Unusually, the new 'primage duty' was not refundable, in the event that the imported goods were re-exported from Victoria to other Australian colonies or to New Zealand. Consequently, Melbourne was at a disadvantage, relative to ports with lower duties, especially Sydney.

Bad as the depression was, it has been noted that it could have been far worse, had the wealth destruction not been shared with British investors. Passive investors from Britain had also lost vast sums. However, the vast amounts of new capital that were needed to reconstruct banks in the Australian colonies also constrained the availability of capital—particularly British capital—at a time when, otherwise, more capital may have boosted economic activity in Australia.

=== Political changes ===
At the 1894 elections, the prevailing sense of economic gloom led to the defeat of the incumbent government. The election also marked the emergence of Labor as a political force, with 16 members in the Legislative Assembly.

=== Reduced government spending ===
In the aftermath of the 1891 crash, the Victorian Government reduced its spending. Many of the railway works envisaged in the 'Octopus Act' of 1884 were not constructed. Parliament passed the Railways Act of 1891 to separate the survey and construction of railways from the organisation operating them, Survey and construction of railways became the responsibility of the Board of Land and Works. Ministerial control over the Railway Commissioners was made tighter, essentially returning to the arrangements that applied before 1883.

Some of the lines that had been constructed were uneconomic. At a time when other colonial railways ran at an overall profit, the Victorian Railways were losing £1,000 per day, and had incurred a deficiency of £9-million by the end of the 19th century. Although the Victorian Railways made an operating profit, after deducting interest bills, it was not profitable.

=== Reputation, redemption, and public memory ===
One 'land boomer' to recover quickly and prosper, in the years following the crash, was W.L Baillieu. Baillieu had repaid his creditors just 6d. in the pound, after his 'secret composition', in July 1892. The 'secret composition' process did not allow a full examination of his assets and debts, and it seems likely that he retained some wealth. In the aftermath of the crash, he bought—at low prices—shares in the London Bank of Australia, which subsequently rose in value; when that bank was taken over by the E.S. & A Bank, Baillieu took a large profit. He also made investments in mining companies, initially in gold mines, culminating in his shared control of the powerful Collins House Group of companies. In 1901, he entered politics and represented Northern Province in the Victorian Legislative Council until 1922. His son, Clive Baillieu, was made a hereditary baron in England.

Benjamin Fink's reputation was badly damaged. It did not recover, during his long absence from Melbourne, but his family's fortune did. His wife Catherine Fink emerged with a valuable real estate portfolio. Fink's socially prominent brothers, the apparently popular Theodore Fink and the academically gifted Woolfe Fink, despite some land boom involvement, resumed successful public lives after the crash. Theodore Fink, already a prominent lawyer in Melbourne, became the member for Jolimont and West Richmond, from 1894 until 1904, and chairman of the board of Herald and Sportsman Newspapers Co. Ltd., which in 1902 became Herald and Weekly Times Limited.

John McAlister Howden (1853–1921), despite his history as the manager and vice-chairman of Mercantile Finance, was president of the Incorporated Institute of Accountants, Victoria (later CPA Australia), in 1901-02 and 1906. Andrew Lyell—after parting company with Mercantile Finance, in 1888, and passing through a 'liquidation by agreement' in 1890—resumed a successful career, as an accountant and conciliator. He too was president of the Incorporated Institute of Accountants, Victoria, from 1894 to 1896.

Sir Thomas Bent suffered damage to his reputation, caused by allegations of corrupt conduct while in office, which he vigorously denied. Benjamin Fink and Bent were close in business, and when Bent was attacked by The Age, in 1888, Fink had been one of those to show support for Bent, publicly. Bent was said to have paid only such of his bills as he needed to avoid insolvency, and he did successfully avoid insolvency. He went on to become the Premier of Victoria, in 1904, although he was under investigation for corrupt behaviour, months before his death in 1909. There is a statue in his honour, and a suburb, Bentleigh, named for him.

Alfred Deakin, who had been a foundation chairman of the Australian City & Suburban Investment and Banking Co. Ltd, later became a Prime Minister of Australia.

Matthew Henry Davies—whose companies caused £4,000,000 in lost wealth, and who had beaten criminal charges over a falsified balance sheet—returned to legal practice, and is said to have eventually restored his good name.

While he was Agent-General in London, a former Premier of Victoria and a future Speaker, Graham Berry, was a London director of the Mercantile Bank of Australia, to which the public subscribed money to buy landholdings from G.W.Taylor. Upon his return to Melbourne, he was the Treasurer of Victoria, but remained a director of the bank, closely associated with Matthew Davies. At the time of his death, in 1904, Berry was remembered as a great liberal reforming politician, former Premier, Treasurer, Speaker, and Agent-General, not as a director of a bank that produced a falsified balance sheet and lost over £1,000,000.

Some public careers did not recover. In 1896, after his release from prison, James Mirams sued The Argus for libel—he had been referred to as a 'third-rate politician' who played 'ducks and drakes'—claiming £10,000 in damages. The jury found he had been libelled, but the words in question were 'substantially true'. He was awarded only £5 in damages. He ended up with a net liability for 96 11s. 2d. in legal costs, over aspects of his claim which did not succeed, leading to his estate being compulsorily sequestrated in December 1896. He was released from insolvency, in March 1897, when it was apparent that he could not pay the debt owing. He worked as a stationer, but his various attempts to re-enter politics failed. James Munro had to live with relatives, and he too was released by the Insolvency Court, because he did not have the means to pay any of his debts.

Another to sue for libel was Richard Speight, erstwhile Commissioner of Railways, who had 'retired with compensation' in 1892. He sued David Syme, proprietor of The Age newspaper, on ten counts. He claimed £25,000 in damages, over allegations that were characterised as, 'political influence', 'incompetence and extravagance', 'waste in stores', 'unnecessary stations', and 'incompetence and refusing information to Age reporters'. The suit had been protracted and expensive; the plaintiff's costs were estimated at around £8,000 and those of the defendant at around £21,000; the court sat for 92 days—not including those days when the jury were making inspections—89 witnesses were called, and 1,030 exhibits were included in the evidence. The final verdict, in September 1894, was that Speight had been libelled, on one count. On the other nine counts the verdict was that, while found to be not true, The Age's allegations had been made as 'fair comment'. Speight was awarded a total of a farthing in damages, essentially vindicating the newspaper. Speight relocated to Western Australia, where he was elected to parliament in 1901, but he died later in the same year.

Few Victorian parliamentarians emerged from the boom well. One who did was Issac Issacs, the Attorney-General, who had doggedly sought prosecutions of those involved with the Mercantile Bank. He later became a member of the House of Representatives, then a High Court judge, and ended his career as the first Australian-born Governor General.

One of the most consistent and courageous critics of the machinations of the land boom era was, Maurice Brodsky (1847–1919), the proprietor and editor of the weekly magazine, Table Talk. His magazine business was badly affected by the ensuing depression, but was financially crippled by a libel case brought by Frederick Bromley. Brodsky became insolvent in July 1903, and subsequently left for America. Table Talk lived on, as part of the Herald and Weekly Times empire, by then effectively controlled by Theodore Fink and the Baillieu family. It seemed that, with time, the embarrassing disclosures of self interest, fraud and mismanagement that Brodsky had made, and other memories of the erstwhile boom, would fade from public memory.

When published in 1929, George Meudell's autobiographical book, The Pleasant Career of a Spendthrift, caused such a reaction that it effectively was withdrawn from sale to the public. There were three chapters in which Benjamin Fink figures prominently, along with other 'land boomers' who Meudell knew. J. M. Gillespie—himself a former land boomer, but, by 1929, chairman of the bookseller Robertson & Mullen—ordered that Robertson & Mullen’s bookstores not stock it, and other booksellers were warned of potential legal action if they did. The book continued to be sold privately. A former Australian Prime Minister, Robert Menzies, owned a copy of that suppressed 1929 version.

A later author, Michael Cannon (1929—2022), wrote that there was a view that Meudell's 1929 book was intended as a form of blackmail; that by raising the questionable behaviour of the land boom era, he was seeking to be bought off by those surviving participants whom he mentioned, or their families. Cannon himself spoke with some people who knew Meudell personally, and he concluded that Meudell was trying to set the record straight, before he died. If so, he apparently later changed his mind.

Meudell later heavily revised his book, presenting some of his subjects in a much more sympathetic light. It was republished, as The Pleasant Career of a Spendthrift, and His Later Reflection, in 1936, the year that Meudell died. A number of references to Benjamin Fink were removed in the revised version, seemingly at the request of Fink's brother, Theodore Fink—by then the chairman of Herald and Weekly Times—who Michael Cannon thought may have actually helped with the rewrite. Also removed was a lengthy list of insolvent land boomers, along with any criticism of W.L. Baillieu.

Michael Cannon's book about the land boom and the many prominent Victorians who participated in it, The Land Boomers, was published in 1966. Even then, over seven decades after the land boom and its disastrous crash, publication of the book brought threats of legal action—to suppress its publication or for libel—which if anything just served to boost its sales. The publication of the book did much to establish the land boom as a topic of historical interest. It was ground-breaking in that Cannon used novel sources—seemingly dry archive material and accounting figures—that he transformed into a highly-readable historical account. A revised version was published in 1995. Michael Cannon wrote a second book on the land boom, Land Boom and Bust, published in 1972.

== Legacy ==
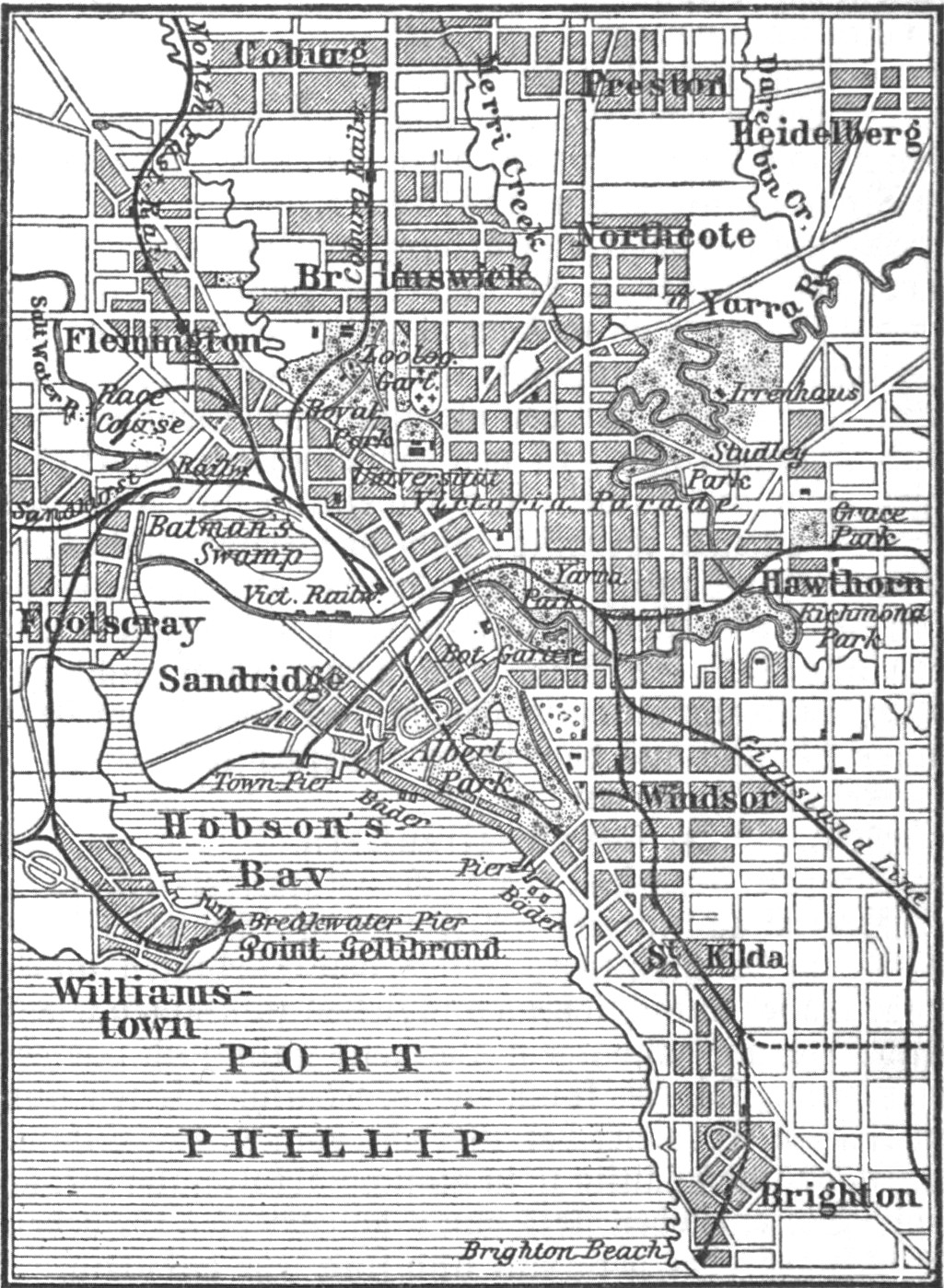
Melbourne and its suburbs (1890). Note the road grids in undeveloped areas, many already sub-divided.

=== Suburbs, buildings and infrastructure ===
Melbourne's suburbs expanded during the years of the land boom, as property was subdivided for housing and the population grew. What are now middle-distance suburbs came about during the land boom including, Hawthorn, Camberwell, Box Hill, Northcote, Brunswick, Essendon, Footscray, Brighton and Mentone. A suburban lifestyle was embraced by both middle class and working class buyers.

The land developers in some cases established entities for the provision of infrastructure, in newly sub-divided areas, such as the Mentone Board of Works and the Clifton Hill to Northcote & Preston Tramway Company Limited. The boom period saw the completion of the Melbourne cable tramway system, most routes of which were later electrified and are still part of Melbourne's tramway network. Some of the suburban railways in Melbourne also date from the boom years.

Some of Melbourne's grandest surviving houses were built during the land boom era, including Villa Alba, Labassa (originally Ontario), Frognall, and Stonington. Other grand houses were built slightly before the boom, but are associated with figures from the boom, such as Armadale House and Raheen.

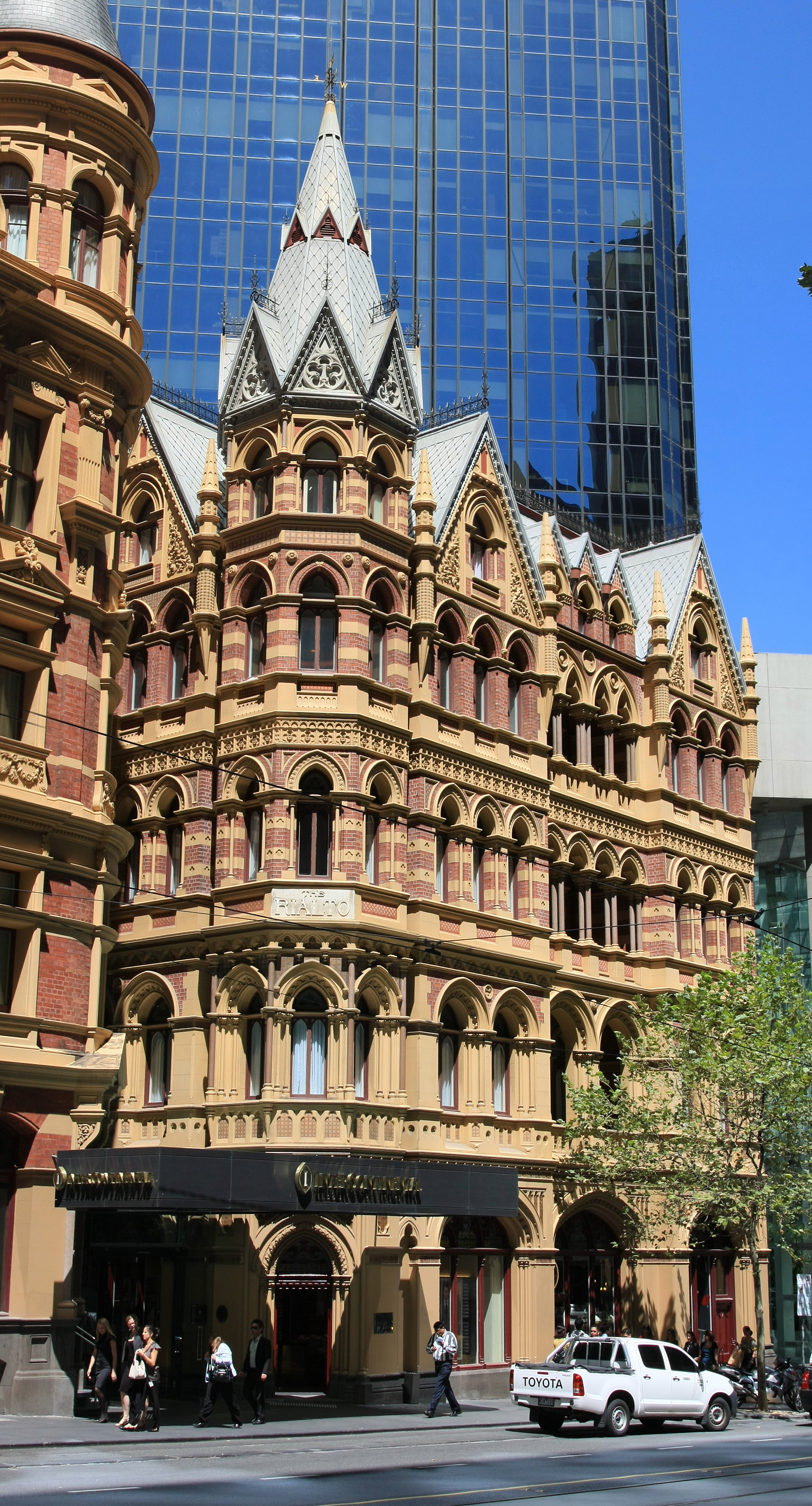
Rialto building

The land boom era, actually the years between 1880 and 1893, saw a huge amount of building in Melbourne's CBD. Buildings of this era are characterised by a distinctive Victorian italianate inspired style, known as the 'boom style'. The cumulative effects of the land boom on the physical appearance of Melbourne were captured in the film Marvellous Melbourne made in 1910. It was made around the time that Melbourne had recovered from the 15-year economic slump, begun by the land boom crash and the subsequent banking crisis. By 1905, Melbourne had lost its position as the most populous city in Australia. But its built environment, after the huge cumulative development that had taken place there during the boom years, had no equal in other Australian cities of the time.

During the period from the 1950s to the 1980s, the elaborate Victorian buildings of the 1880s were seen by many as dated and impractical, and many buildings were demolished. However, some remain, such as The Block Arcade, the ANZ Bank headquarters building, the Hotel Windsor, the facade of the Princess Theatre. and the buildings known as the Rialto, Winfield and Olderfleet building group. There are also various government and church buildings from the period, including the Royal Exhibition Building, dating from 1880, and St Paul’s Cathedral.

=== Laws and the regulation of banks, companies and markets ===
The old Victorian Companies Act of 1864 contained loopholes that allowed legal, but unethical, activities that enriched the entrepreneurs who made use of such aspects of the legislation.

Criticism of the laxity of the existing law, which had permitted excesses—such as floating companies at inflated valuations, manipulation of public companies for benefit of directors, questionable voluntary liquidations of indebted companies, and abuse of 'secret compositions'—led to a tightening of company and Insolvency laws, and increased regulation of banks and other lending institutions. Indirectly, these changes were a legacy of the land boom.

Michael Cannon in his book, The Land Boomers, wrote: "Through the eyes of a later and more fortunate generation, the land boom era may be regarded as a watershed to the development of a free but regulated private enterprise system in Australia" and that, "The disasters of the 1890s made it apparent to most people that while uncontrolled capitalism might be a marvellous way of unleashing human energy and ambition, it could also be a devilish force capable of recoiling indiscriminately on the just and the unjust and causing enormous suffering."

=== A lesson from history ===
Around a century after the 1893 banking crisis, two banks collapsed, having made poor decisions in the wake of banking deregulation.

The 1880s Melbourne land boom is often cited as a classic example of a speculative bubble. With Australian land and property values at all time highs, in the mid 2020s, some see another Australian property bubble developing and the excesses of the land boom era as a warning.
