= Electoral results for the district of North Melbourne =

Victoria, Australia, district election results

This is a list of electoral results for the electoral district of North Melbourne in Victorian state elections.

== Members for North Melbourne ==
Two members initially, one from the redistribution of 1889 when Port Melbourne and other districts were created.

Member 1	Term	Member 2	Term
John Sinclair	Oct 1859 – Jul 1861	George Elliott Barton	Oct 1859 – Jul? 1861
Patrick Costello	Aug 1861 – Nov 1861^{[x]}	John Davies	Aug 1861 – Aug 1864
John Sinclair	Nov 1861– Aug 1864	John Davies	Aug 1861 – Aug 1864
John Goulson Burtt	Nov 1864 – Mar 1874	William Robinson	Nov 1864 – Dec 1865
John Goulson Burtt	Nov 1864 – Mar 1874	John Harbison	Feb 1866 – Jan 1871
James Munro	May 1874 – Apr 1877	John Curtain	Apr 1871 – Apr 1877
John Laurens	May 1877 – Mar 1889	Joseph Storey	May 1877 – Mar 1881
John Laurens	May 1877 – Mar 1889	James Munro	Apr 1881^{[b]} – Feb 1883
John Laurens	May 1877 – Mar 1889	James Rose	Feb 1883 – Mar 1889

Single Member District 1889–1927
Member	Party	Term
John Laurens	Unaligned	1889–1892
David Wyllie	Unaligned	1892–1893
Sylvanus Reynolds^{[b]}	Unaligned	1893–1894
George Prendergast	Labour	1894–1897
William Watt	Unaligned	1897–1900
George Prendergast	Labor	1900–1927

^{b} = by-election
^{x} = expelled

== Election results ==
=== Elections in the 1920s ===
1924 Victorian state election: North Melbourne
Party	Candidate	Votes	%	±%
Labor	George Prendergast	unopposed		
Labor hold		Swing		

1921 Victorian state election: North Melbourne
Party	Candidate	Votes	%	±%
Labor	George Prendergast	unopposed		
Labor hold		Swing		

1920 Victorian state election: North Melbourne
Party	Candidate	Votes	%	±%
Labor	George Prendergast	7,359	67.8	+1.4
Nationalist	Henry Raphael	3,496	32.2	−1.4
Total formal votes		10,855	98.6	+2.4
Informal votes		152	1.4	−2.4
Turnout		11,007	62.7	+10.1
Labor hold		Swing	+1.4	

=== Elections in the 1910s ===
1917 Victorian state election: North Melbourne
Party	Candidate	Votes	%	±%
Labor	George Prendergast	5,731	66.4	−3.1
Nationalist	John Vroland	2,899	33.6	+3.1
Total formal votes		8,630	96.2	−0.6
Informal votes		341	3.8	+0.6
Turnout		8,971	52.6	+7.6
Labor hold		Swing	−3.1	

1914 Victorian state election: North Melbourne
Party	Candidate	Votes	%	±%
Labor	George Prendergast	5,294	69.5	+10.9
Liberal	Henry Nolan	2,320	30.5	−10.9
Total formal votes		7,614	96.8	−2.1
Informal votes		253	3.2	+2.1
Turnout		7,867	45.0	−19.8
Labor hold		Swing	+10.9	

1911 Victorian state election: North Melbourne
Party	Candidate	Votes	%	±%
Labor	George Prendergast	5,637	58.6	N/A
Liberal	Solomon Bloom	3,982	41.4	+41.4
Total formal votes		9,619	98.9	
Informal votes		103	1.1	
Turnout		9,722	64.8	
Labor hold		Swing	N/A	
