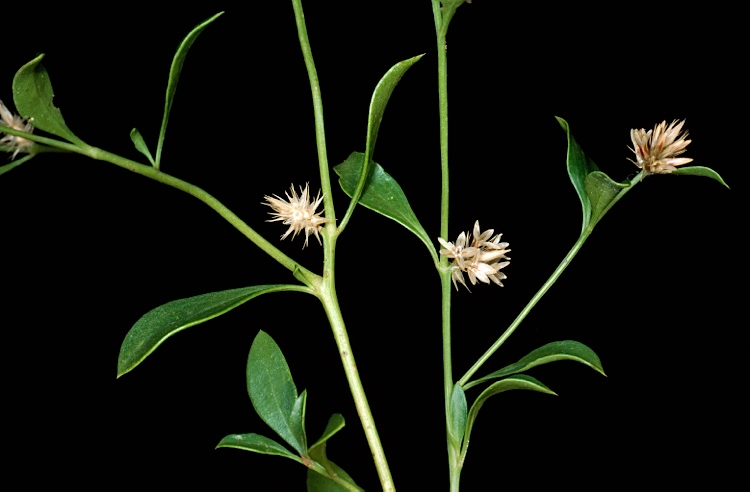

Scientific classification
- Kingdom: Plantae
- Clade: Tracheophytes
- Clade: Angiosperms
- Clade: Eudicots
- Order: Caryophyllales
- Family: Amaranthaceae
- Genus: Ptilotus
- Species: P. capitatus

Binomial name
- Ptilotus capitatus F.Muell.

Synonyms
- Psilotrichum capitatum F.Muell.; Ptilotus macleayi F.Muell.; Ptilotus psilotrichoides F.Muell. nom. illeg., nom. superfl.; Trichinium macleayi (F.Muell.) Ewart & O.B.Davies

= Ptilotus capitatus =

Species of grass-like plant

Ptilotus capitatus is a species of flowering plant in the family Amaranthaceae and is endemic to north-western Australia. It is an erect or spreading perennial herb or shrub with lance-shaped stem leaves and spikes of white or brown flowers.

== Description ==
Ptilotus capitatus is an erect or spreading perennial herb or shrub that typically grows to 0.25–1 m (9.8 in – 3 ft 3.4 in) high. There are no leaves at the base of the plant, but the stems have lance-shaped leaves arranged alternately, 8–70 mm (0.31–2.76 in) long and 2–26 mm (0.079–1.024 in) wide. The flowers are white or brown and densely arranged in oval or cylindrical spikes. The bracts are 4.0–4.8 mm (0.16–0.19 in) long and the bracteoles are 4.4–5.2 mm (0.17–0.20 in) long, colourless, glabrous and awned. The outer tepals are 4.8–5.7 mm (0.19–0.22 in) long and the inner tepals are 4.5–5.3 mm (0.18–0.21 in) long. The style is 1.5–2.0 mm (0.059–0.079 in) long and fixed to the centre of the ovary. Flowering occurs from April to September.

== Taxonomy ==
This species was first formally described in 1859 by Ferdinand von Mueller who gave it the name Psilotrichum capitatum in his Fragmenta Phytographiae Australiae. In 1930, Charles Gardner transferred the species to Ptilotus as P. capitatus. The specific epithet (capitatus) means 'capitate'.

== Distribution ==
Ptilotus capitatus grows on sandy or clay soils in rocky places in the Central Kimberley, Dampierland, Northern Kimberley, Ord Victoria Plain and Victoria Bonaparte bioregions of northern Western Australia and the Northern Territory.

== Conservation status ==
This species of Ptilotus is listed as "not threatened" by the Government of Western Australia Department of Biodiversity, Conservation and Attractions. and as "data deficient" under the Northern Territory Territory Parks and Wildlife Conservation Act.

== See also ==
- List of Ptilotus species
