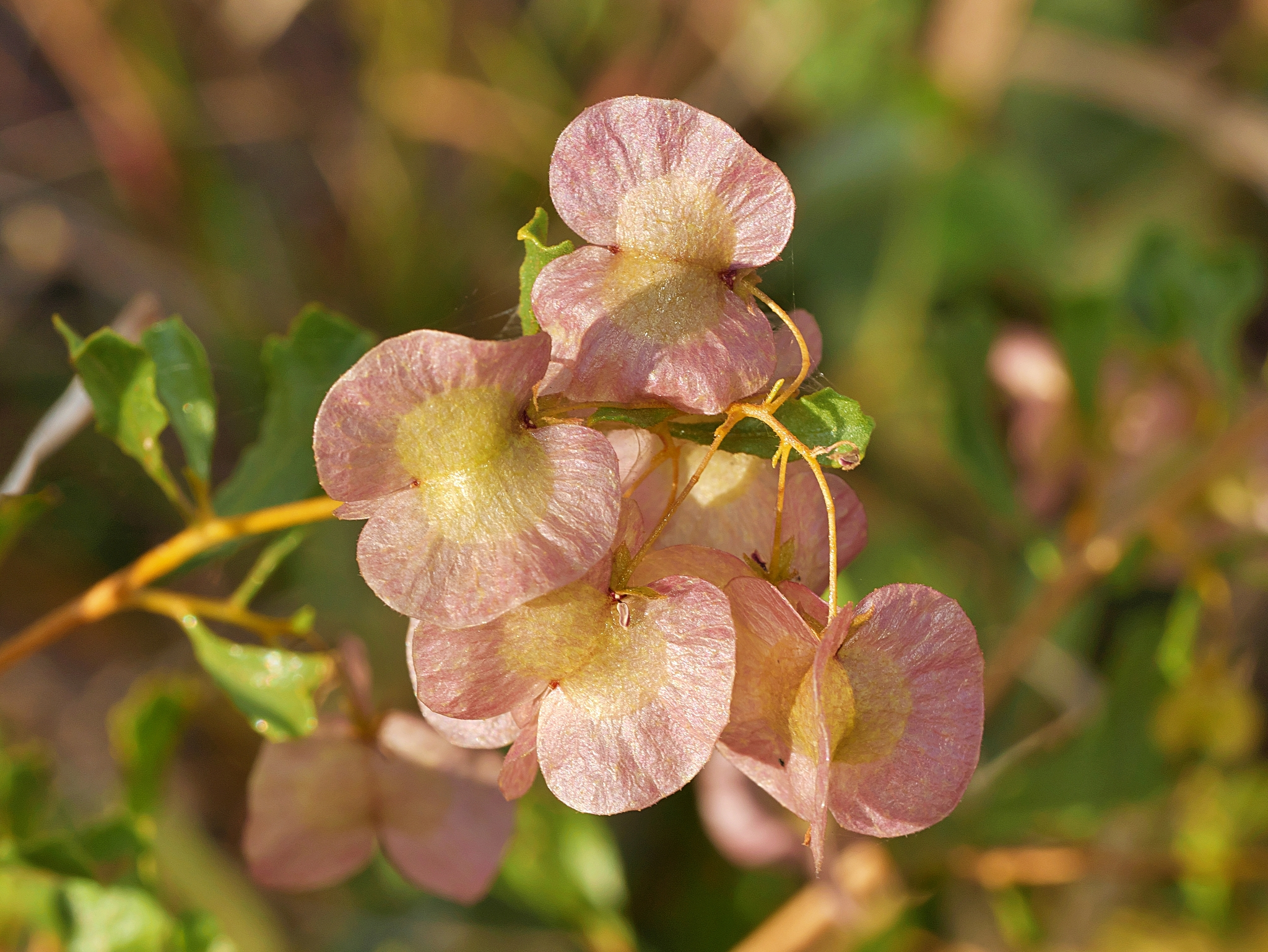
- In Wolfe Creek Meteorite Crater

Scientific classification
- Kingdom: Plantae
- Clade: Tracheophytes
- Clade: Angiosperms
- Clade: Eudicots
- Clade: Rosids
- Order: Sapindales
- Family: Sapindaceae
- Genus: Dodonaea
- Species: D. coriacea

Binomial name
- Dodonaea coriacea (Ewart & O.B.Davies) McGill.

Synonyms
- Dodonaea peduncularis var. coriacea Ewart & O.B.Davies

= Dodonaea coriacea =

Species of shrub

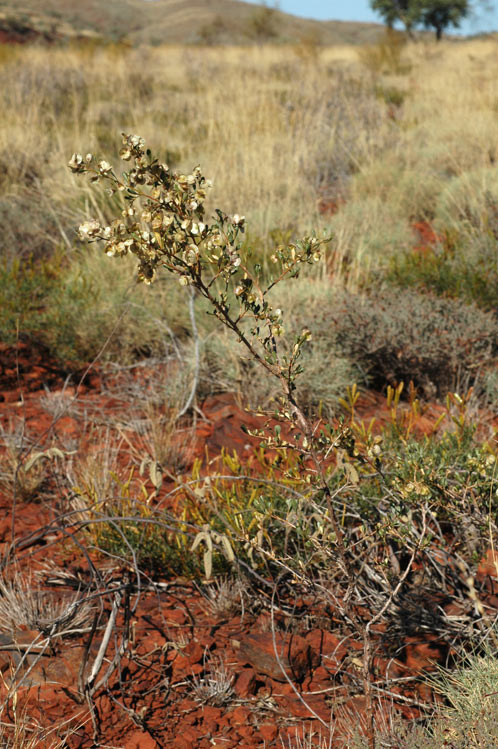
Habit west-north-west of Newman

Dodonaea coriacea is a species of plant in the family Sapindaceae and is endemic to northern Australia. It is an erect to spreading shrub with simple, sessile, egg-shaped to lance-shaped leaves with the narrower end towards the base, flowers arranged in panicles on the ends of branches, and three-winged capsules with membranous wings.

== Description ==
Dodonaea coriacea is an erect to spreading, andromonoecious or gynomonoecious shrub that typically grows to a height of 0.3–1.5 m (1 ft 0 in – 4 ft 11 in). Its leaves are simple and sessile, egg-shaped to lance-shaped with the narrower end towards the base, 14–30 mm (0.55–1.18 in) long and 5–9 mm (0.20–0.35 in) wide. The flowers are arranged in panicles on the ends of branches, each flower on a pedicel 6.5–11.5 mm (0.26–0.45 in) long. The four or five sepals are lance-shaped to egg-shaped, 1.6–2.4 mm (0.063–0.094 in) long and persist until the fruiting stage. Each flower has four or five stamens and the ovary has soft hairs. The fruit is a three-winged, elliptic capsule 11.5–18.5 mm (0.45–0.73 in) long and 13.5–18 mm (0.53–0.71 in) wide, with membranous wings 3.5–5.5 mm (0.14–0.22 in) wide.

== Taxonomy and naming ==
This species was first formally described in 1917 by Alfred James Ewart and Olive Blanche Davies who gave it the name ''Dodonaea peduncularis var. coriacea in the Flora of the Northern Territory from specimens collected by Gerald Freer Hill on the Barclay-McPherson expedition of 1911–1912, 70 mi (110 km) north of "Camp IV" in 1911. Ewart had offered to pay five shillings for every new plant species collected on the expedition. In 1975, Donald McGillivray raised the variety to species status as Dodonaea coriacea in the journal Telopea. The specific epithet (coriacea) means 'leathery'.

== Distribution and habitat ==
Dodonaea coriacea grows in deep red sand and on quartzite and laterite hills in grassland or open woodland from the Hamersley Range in western Australia, through the central Northern Territory to near the Mount Isa and Quilpie areas of western Queensland.

== Conservation status ==
Dodonaea coriacea is listed as "not threatened" by the Government of Western Australia Department of Biodiversity, Conservation and Attractions, as of "least concern" in the Territory Parks and Wildlife Conservation Act and the Queensland Nature Conservation Act 1992.
