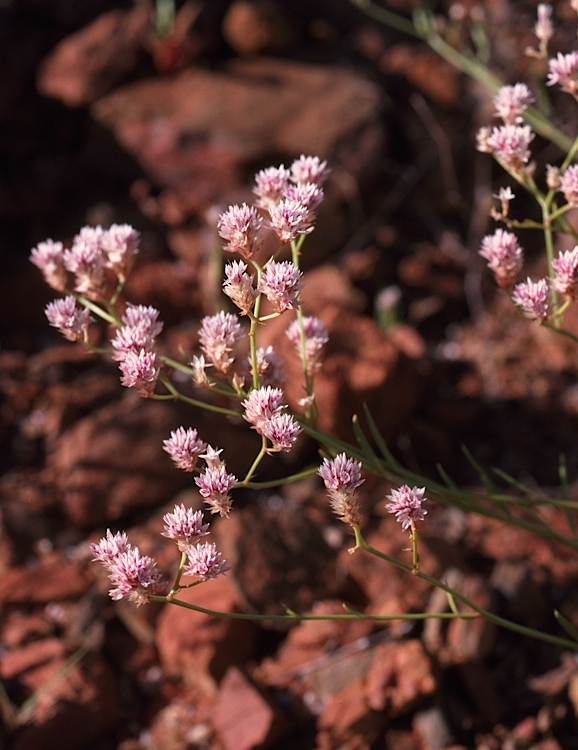
- Near Halls Creek

Scientific classification
- Kingdom: Plantae
- Clade: Tracheophytes
- Clade: Angiosperms
- Clade: Eudicots
- Order: Caryophyllales
- Family: Amaranthaceae
- Genus: Ptilotus
- Species: P. corymbosus

Binomial name
- Ptilotus corymbosus R.Br.

Synonyms
- Ptilotus corymbosus var. acutiflorus Benth.; Ptilotus corymbosus R.Br. var. corymbosus; Trichinium corymbosum (R.Br.) Spreng.; Trichinium corymbosum var. acutiflorum (Benth.) Ewart & O.B.Davies; Trichinium corymbosum (R.Br.) Spreng. var. corymbosum

= Ptilotus corymbosus =

Species of herb

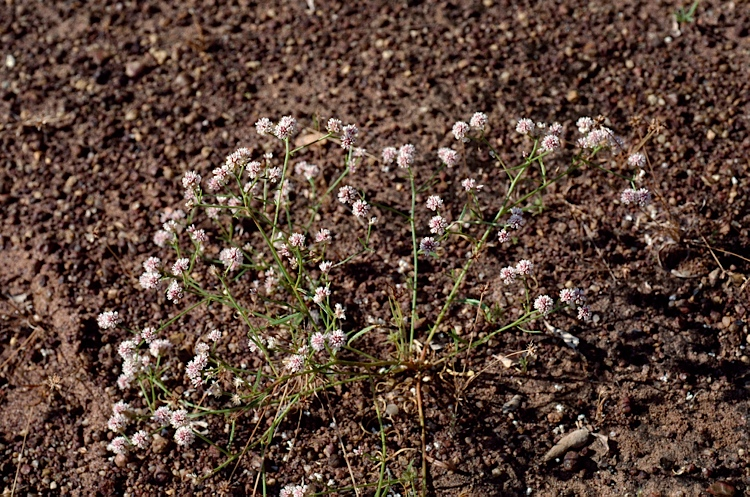
Habit near Gibb River Road

Ptilotus corymbosus is a species of flowering plant in the family Amaranthaceae and is endemic to northern Australia. It is an erect or open annual herb, with more or less glabrous stems and leaves, purple, pink or white oval or cylindrical spikes of flowers with five stamens.

== Description ==
Ptilotus corymbosus is an erect or open annual herb that typically grows up to 60 cm (24 in) high, and has glabrous stems and leaves. The leaves on the stems are linear to lance-shaped, 5–80 mm (0.20–3.15 in) long and 1–10 mm (0.039–0.394 in) wide, but there are no leaves at the base of the plant. The flowers are purple, pink or white, borne in oval to cylindrical heads 5–30 mm (0.20–1.18 in) long and 6–15 mm (0.24–0.59 in) wide. There are bracts 2.0–2.5 mm (0.079–0.098 in) long with a prominent midrib, and similar bracteoles 2.6–3.0 mm (0.10–0.12 in) long, at the base of the flowers. The tepals are 4–5 mm (0.16–0.20 in) long with a tuft of hairs on the inner surface. There are five stamens and the style is straight, 1.5–2.2 mm (0.059–0.087 in) long. Flowering occurs from March to July and the seeds are 1.0–1.1 mm (0.039–0.043 in) long and glossy brown.

== Taxonomy ==
Ptilotus corymbosus was first formally described in 1810 by Robert Brown in his Prodromus Florae Novae Hollandiae et Insulae Van Diemen. The specific epithet (corymbosus) means 'corymbose'.

== Distribution and habitat ==
This species of Ptilotus grows in loam, sand or clay on low ridges in the Central Kimberley, Dampierland, Northern Kimberley, Ord Victoria Plain, Victoria Bonaparte bioregions of Western Australia, widespread in the north of the Northern Territory, and in the Lawn Hill area of north-west Queensland.

== Conservation status ==
Ptilotus corymbosus is listed as "not threatened" by the Government of Western Australia Department of Biodiversity, Conservation and Attractions, and as of "least concern" under the Northern Territory Parks and Wildlife Conservation Act and the Queensland Government Nature Conservation Act 1992.

== See also ==
- List of Ptilotus species
