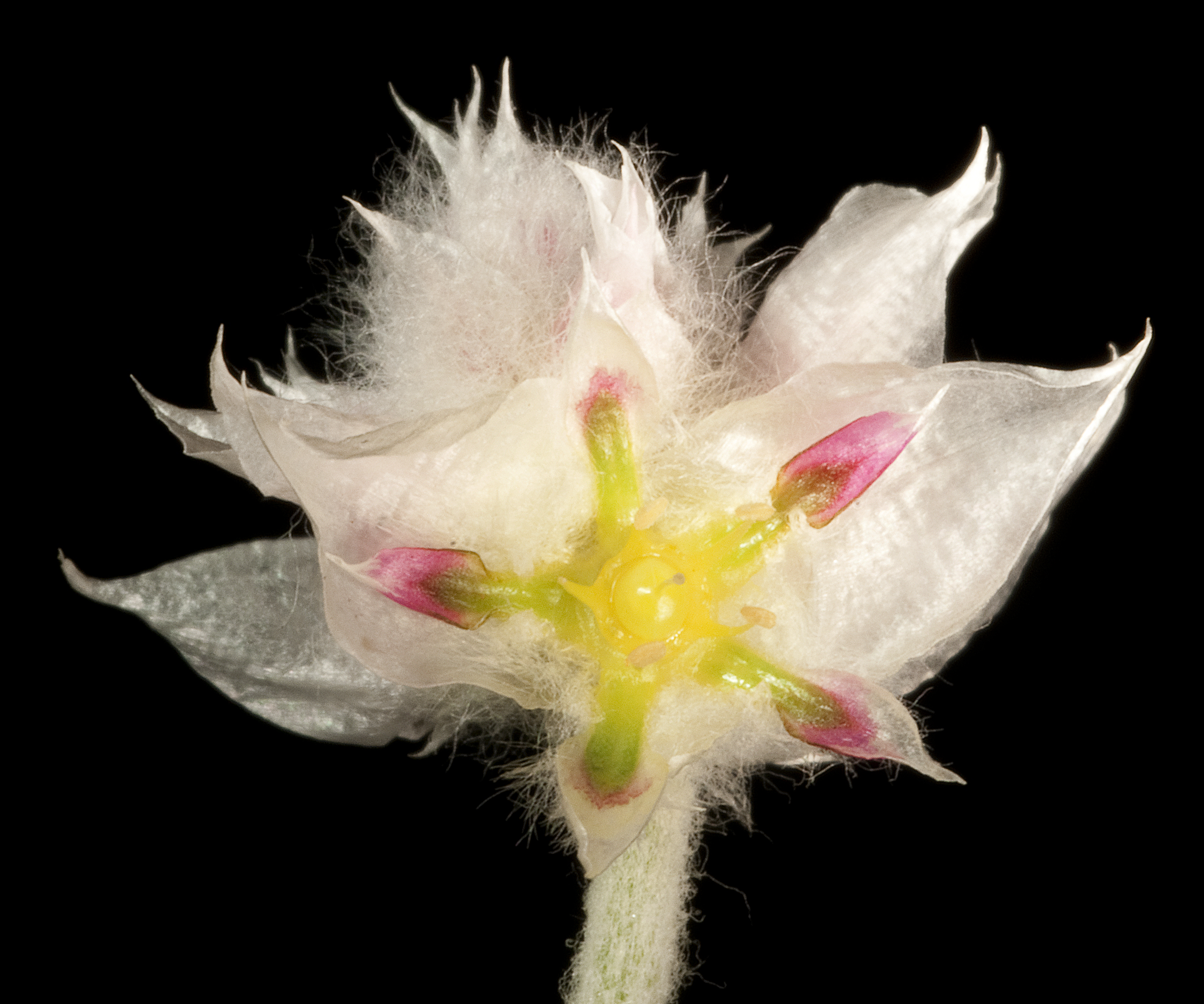

Conservation status
- Least Concern (NCA)

Scientific classification
- Kingdom: Plantae
- Clade: Embryophytes
- Clade: Tracheophytes
- Clade: Spermatophytes
- Clade: Angiosperms
- Clade: Eudicots
- Order: Caryophyllales
- Family: Amaranthaceae
- Genus: Ptilotus
- Species: P. latifolius

Binomial name
- Ptilotus latifolius R.Br.
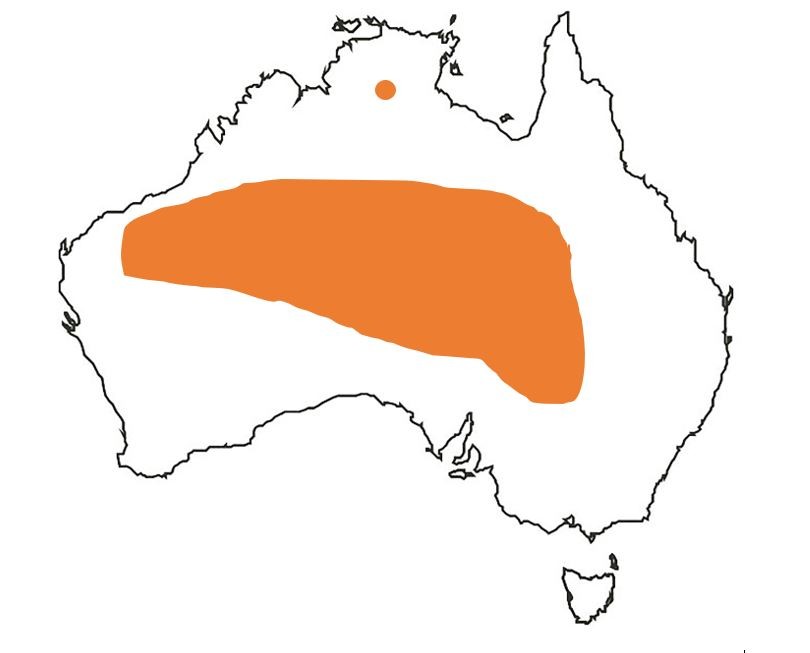
- Distribution map for Ptilotus latifolius in Australia

Synonyms
- Ptilotus latifolius R.Br. subsp. latifolius; Ptilotus latifolius R.Br. var. latifolius; Ptilotus latifolius var. maior Benl orth. var.; Ptilotus latifolius var. major Benl; Trichinium latifolium (R.Br.) Ewart & O.B.Davies

= Ptilotus latifolius =

Species of plant

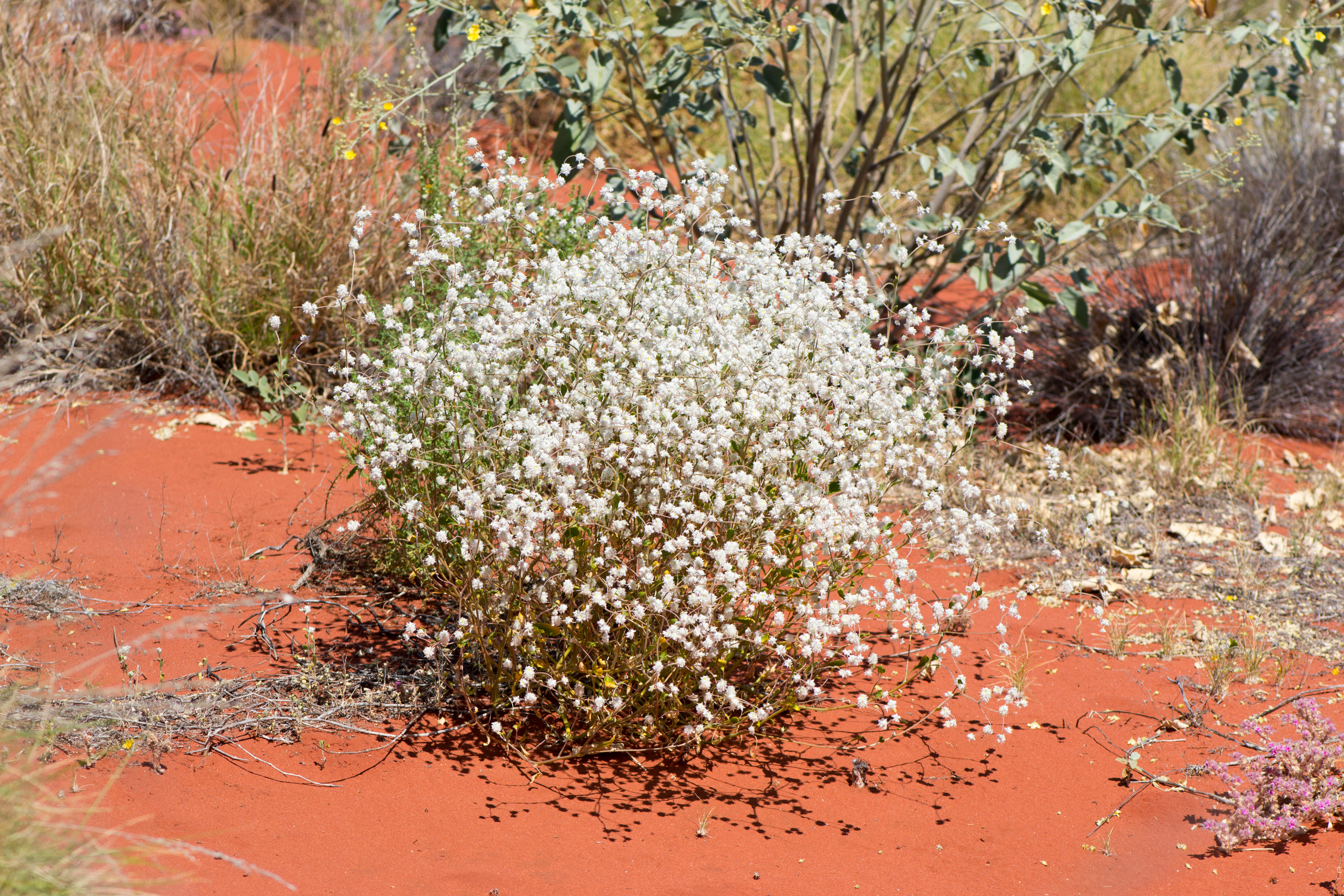
Habit near Carnarvon

Ptilotus latifolius, commonly known as tangled mulla mulla or white foxtail, is a species of flowering plant in the family Amaranthaceae and is endemic to Australia. It is an annual or short-lived perennial herb with hairy stems and leaves, egg-shaped leaves and spherical or oval spikes of white flowers.

== Description ==
Ptilotus latifolius is a much-branched, rounded, annual or perennial herb that usually grows to a height less than 70 cm (28 in). Its stems are densely covered with woolly, branched or simple hairs, often becoming glabrous with age. The stem leaves are egg-shaped with the narrower end towards the base, 8–45 mm (0.31–1.77 in) long and 5–16 mm (0.20–0.63 in) wide with fewer hairs than on the stems. The flowers are densely arranged in spherical or oval spikes up to 25 mm (0.98 in) long and 10–17 mm (0.39–0.67 in) wide, each flower with five perianth segments 4–6 mm (0.16–0.24 in) long with colourless bracts about 3.5 mm (0.14 in) long and bracteoles 6–10 mm (0.24–0.39 in) long that are longer than the perianth and resemble sepals. There are 5 stamens and the ovary is sessile. Flowering occurs in most months with a peak between July and October.

== Taxonomy ==
Ptilotus latifolius was first formally described in 1849 by Robert Brown in Charles Sturt's Narrative of an Expedition into Central Australia. The specific epithet (latifolius) means 'broad-leaved'.

== Distribution and habitat ==
Tangled mulla mulla grows on sand dunes and stony plains in the Carnarvon, Central Ranges, Dampierland, Gascoyne, Great Sandy Desert, Great Victoria Desert, Little Sandy Desert and Pilbara bioregions of northern Western Australia, the Burt Plain, Central Ranges, Finke, Gascoyne, Gibson Desert, Great Sandy Desert, Little Sandy Desert, MacDonnell Ranges, Simpson Strzelecki Dunefields and Stony Plains bioregions of the Northern Territory, the Central Ranges, Channel Country, Simpson Strzelecki Dunefields and Stony plains bioregions of north-western South Australia, the south-west of Queensland and the far north-west of New South Wales.

== Ecology ==
Seeds develop inside enclosed tepals that act as a seed case and are distributed by the wind.
