= Patrick Costello =

Patrick or Pat Costello may refer to:

- Patrick Costello (Australian politician) (1824–1896), Australian businessman and politician
- Patrick Costello (musician), bass player and vocalist for Dillinger Four
- Patrick Costello (Irish politician) (born 1980), Irish Green Party TD
- Pat Costello (rower) (1929–2014), American rower
- Pat Costello (actor), American actor, producer and stunt double

== See also ==
- Desmond Patrick Costello (1912–1964), New Zealand linguist, soldier and diplomat
- Victor Costello (Victor Carton Patrick Costello, born 1970), Irish rugby union player and Olympic shot putter
