= Frognall, Melbourne =

Heritage-listed mansion in Melbourne, Victoria, Australia

Frognall
- Location within Melbourne

General information
- Status: Completed
- Type: Mansion
- Architectural style: Victorian Italianate
- Location: 54 Mont Albert Road, Canterbury, Melbourne, Victoria, Australia
- Coordinates: 37°49′02″S 145°03′50″E
- Groundbreaking: 1889
- Completed: 1891; 135 years ago
- Client: Clarence Hicks

Design and construction
- Architect: James Gall

Victorian Heritage Register
- Official name: Frognall
- Type: Registered place
- Designated: 5 October 1988
- Reference no.: VHR H0707
- Heritage overlay no.: HO099
- Categories: Parks, Gardens and Trees; Residential buildings (private)

Register of the National Estate
- Official name: Frognall
- Type: Defunct register
- Designated: undated
- Reference no.: 14277

Frognall is a large boom-era mansion located at 54 Mont Albert Road in Canterbury, an inner east suburb of Melbourne, in Victoria, Australia.

The building was added to the Victorian Heritage Register on 5 October 1988 in recognition of its historic and architectural significance; and was also added to non-statutory lists by the Victorian branch of the National Trust on 3 August 1988 and the now defunct Register of the National Estate on an unknown date.

== History ==
Frognall was designed by James Gall in 1888 in the Victorian Italianate style that was popular during the boom period of 1880s Melbourne. It was built between 1889 and 1891 for the prominent timber merchant Clarence Hicks, although he did not stay long as he was forced to sell during the financial collapse of 1893.

In 1901 the building was purchased by the Laycock family who stayed there until 1942 when they offered the building to the Commonwealth Government to help with the war effort. The house became part of the Royal Australian Air Force (RAAF) communications network during the war and was occupied by the RAAF for more than forty years afterwards.

== Architecture ==
Frognall is an example of the Italianate-style mansion which is commonly associated with the boom period of Melbourne architecture in the 1880s, although it is unusual in the extent of its ornamentation. It has a particularly rich level of cement render detailing, including arcaded and balustraded loggia. The grandeur of the building is enhanced by its pedimented entrance and deep bracketed eaves. The tower is capped at each side by projecting broken pediments.

Frognall is typical of the wave of large mansions which were built in Melbourne's eastern suburbs during the 1880s (other examples include Raheen, Kew and Stonington mansion. However it is a rare example that has retained almost its entire original sub-division lot of 1859 and the core of the decorative garden that was created when the building was completed. It is also one of the rare boom period mansions which have retained their service wing, and stable and coach house block in original condition.

== See also ==
- Architecture of Melbourne
- List of places on the Victorian Heritage Register in the City of Boroondara
