= Federal Bank of Australia =

Melbourne bank

Ink imprint from September 1895, after the bank had entered liquidation.

The Federal Bank of Australia was established in Melbourne in 1881, and opened for business in April, 1882. Initially successful, the company expanded to New South Wales by absorbing the Sydney and Country Bank Limited in 1882. Banknotes were issued at branches in Melbourne, Sydney and Adelaide. The headquarters was in a modest building on the corner of Elizabeth and Collins Street in Melbourne.

The managing director was the politician James Munro, who was Premier of Victoria in 1890-1892. He was also president on the Federal Building Society, established about the same time as the Federal Bank. Both institutions principally invested in speculative land companies, which boomed in the 1880s as the economy expanded, and property prices climbed to a frenzied peak in about 1890. The Melbourne land boom was followed by a crash, and the precipitous decline in property prices led to the collapse of building societies burdened by unsustainable debts, with the uncertainty soon spreading to banks. A run by depositors in late 1892 forced the Federal to close its doors "temporarily" on 30 January 1893.

The doors never reopened, and the Federal became the first bank, as opposed to building society, to fail as part of the Australian banking crisis of 1893. A provisional liquidator was appointed on 3 February 1893. The extent of the bank's debts, especially to English banks, was soon revealed. James Munro, already in debt (much to his own companies), had resigned as Premier in early 1892, and left for the UK, but returned voluntarily, and was declared bankrupt in February 1893. His personal debts amounted to £97,000, and his companies owed over £600,000.

The liquidation of the bank soon revealed large loans from the bank to related parties. However, by that time, the relevant parties had been released from their debts—most via the process known as a 'liquidation by arrangement', also known as a 'secret composition'—and any loan guarantees they had given had become worthless. The loans would, for the most part, never be repaid.

Directors of the bank and ex-manager Priestley tried to put the blame on the assistant manager, Pinnock, who had conveniently decamped to South Africa. Nobody would face charges in relation to the misconduct at the Federal Bank. By October 1896, the liquidation of the Federal Bank had returned dividends totalling 7s. 6d. in the pound, with the final amount expected to be 9s. 6d. or even more.
