= James Munro (Australian politician) =

Australian politician (1832–1908)

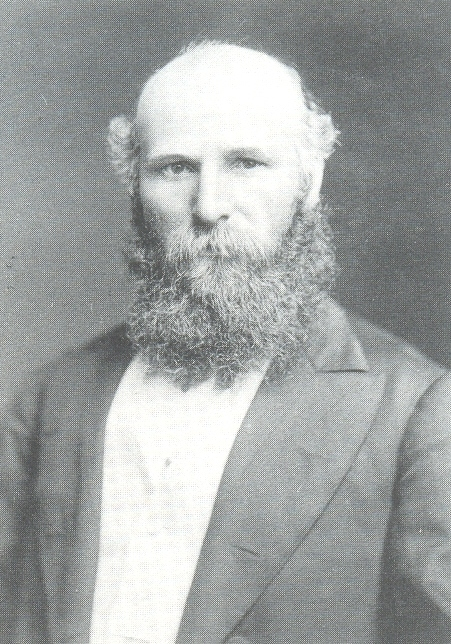

15th Premier of Victoria
- In office 5 November 1890 – 16 February 1892
- Preceded by: Duncan Gillies
- Succeeded by: William Shiels

Personal details
- Born: 7 January 1832 Sutherland, Scotland
- Died: 25 February 1908 (aged 76)
- Resting place: St Kilda Cemetery
- Spouse: Jane Macdonald

James Munro (7 January 1832 – 25 February 1908) was a Scottish born Australian businessman and colonial politician, and the 15th Premier of Victoria. He is best known as one of the leading figures in the land boom of the 1880s and especially the subsequent crash of the early 1890s, where his Christian morals were seen to clash with his business activities.

== Early life ==
James Munro was born in Armadale, Sutherland, Scotland, to Donald Munro and his wife, Georgina. James Munro's grandparents were Alexander Munro and Barbara Mackay, who according to Australian Representative Men, 2nd edition (1887), and Burke's Colonial Gentry (1891), were a cadet of the Munro of Foulis family, Ross-shire, and a relative of the chief of Clan Mackay respectively. However, Y chromosome DNA testing of paternal descendants and relatives of Alexander has confirmed that he was not descended from the Munros of Foulis. After a primary education at a village school in Armadale, Sutherland, Munro left home for Edinburgh and joined a firm of publishers. In December 1853, he married Jane MacDonald, and had a family of four sons and three daughters. In 1858, he emigrated to Victoria where he set up a printing business. In the 1860s, he expanded into banking and promoting building societies. In 1865, he founded the Victorian Permanent Building Society, of which he was manager for 17 years. By 1870, he was a very wealthy man, and he continued to engage in speculation, particularly in land, after entering politics, as was then the common practice. In 1881, he resigned from the Victorian Permanent Building Society to set up the twin institutions of the Federal Building Society and the Federal Bank of Australia, mostly investing in land, in which he also invested.

He was also a leading temperance advocate and prominent in the Presbyterian church. In the boom years of the 1880s, the idea of "temperance hotels", that provided accommodation, dining rooms etc., but did not serve alcohol, was taken up with gusto in Australia, where they were usually called Coffee Palaces, and Munro was leading exponent. In 1886, he was a partner in a company that bought the recently built Grand Hotel (later to become the Hotel Windsor) in Spring Street, and turned it into a coffee palace. It was more than doubled its size in 1888, and Munro had a major shareholding at least five other large coffee palaces.

== Political career ==
Munro was elected to the Victorian Legislative Assembly as one of two members for North Melbourne in 1874. In 1877 he was elected for the new seat of Carlton, then for North Melbourne again in 1881, where he was defeated in 1883. In 1886, he was elected as one of the three members for Geelong, retaining his seat until he resigned in 1892.

Initially a liberal, Munro was Minister of Public Instruction in the first government of the radical leader Graham Berry, but became increasingly conservative in the 1880s and did not hold office in Berry's later governments. He was also preoccupied with business in these years, since his companies, the Federal Bank and the Federal Building Society, were leading players in the speculative Land Boom that gripped the colony. Unlike many of the Land Boomers, he had a reputation for stern Scots integrity, and as the Boom faded in 1890 he emerged as leader of the opposition to the government of Duncan Gillies. In November he moved a successful no-confidence motion in the Gillies government and became Premier — he was the third Scottish-born Premier in succession.

Munro's government was generally liberal, but was weakened by the absence of Alfred Deakin, the leading Victorian liberal, who chose to concentrate on the campaign for Federation of Australia. It was quite unable to cope with the accelerating financial collapse which began almost as soon as it took office. The crash climaxed in early 1893 with the failure of a number of banks. Munro's own companies were part of the problem as the bottom fell out of the land market, and in November 1892 the Federal Building Society went into voluntary liquidation, with the Federal Bank closing the doors on 30 January 1893.

== Financial ruin ==
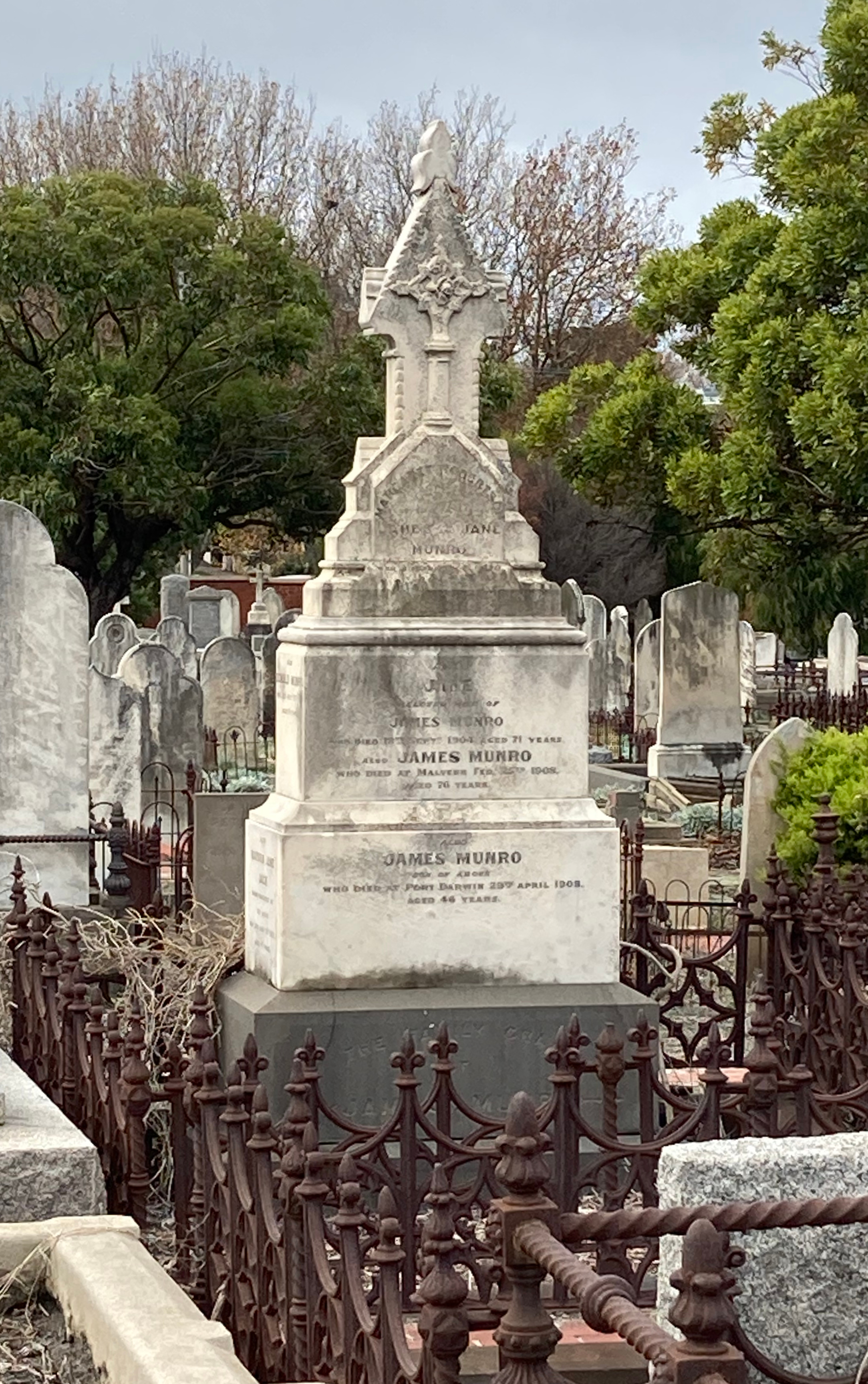
Munro's grave at St Kilda Cemetery

In February 1892 Munro, who was deeply in debt, asked his Cabinet to appoint him Victorian Agent-General in London. He then resigned as Premier and immediately took ship from Port Melbourne. When the news broke there was a storm of protest, led by the many investors whose savings had been wiped out in Munro's companies. Eventually Munro's successor, William Shiels, agreed to recall him from London. To his credit, he returned voluntarily to Victoria, where he was declared bankrupt in February 1893, with personal debts of £97,000. His companies left debts of over £600,000 – a staggering amount at that time. A few weeks later he was attacked and beaten unconscious in a Melbourne street by a man who had been ruined in the crash.

== Legacy ==
Munro has gone down in history as the most notorious of the corrupt Victorian politicians of the Land Boom period. The fact that he was an evangelical Christian who loudly criticised the morals of others has seen him branded a hypocrite as well. In fact it was never proved that he was personally guilty of corruption – unlike the four members of Parliament who eventually went to jail, or the Speaker of the Legislative Assembly, Sir Matthew Davies, who fled the colony in disgrace and narrowly escaped jail. His business practices were dubious, but usually within the very loose legal framework of business regulation of the time. After being discharged from bankruptcy he finished his days as an estate agent in Armadale.

== Bibliography ==
- Geoff Browne, A Biographical Register of the Victorian Parliament, 1900–84, Government Printer, Melbourne, 1985
- Don Garden, Victoria: A History, Thomas Nelson, Melbourne, 1984
- Kathleen Thompson and Geoffrey Serle, A Biographical Register of the Victorian Parliament, 1856–1900, Australian National University Press, Canberra, 1972
- Raymond Wright, A People's Counsel. A History of the Parliament of Victoria, 1856–1990, Oxford University Press, Melbourne, 1992
- Serle, Percival (1949). "Munro, James". Dictionary of Australian Biography. Sydney: Angus & Robertson.
- Mitchell, Ann M. "Munro, James (1832–1908)". Australian Dictionary of Biography. National Centre of Biography, Australian National University. ISBN 978-0-522-84459-7. ISSN 1833-7538. OCLC 70677943.

Political offices
Preceded by Duncan Gillies	Premier of Victoria; 1890–1892	Succeeded by William Shiels
Parliament of Victoria
Preceded by John Burtt	Member for North Melbourne; 1874–1877	Succeeded by John Laurens
New division	Member for Carlton; 1877–1880	Succeeded by John Gardiner
Preceded by Joseph Storey	Member for North Melbourne; 1881–1883	Succeeded by James Rose
Preceded by George Cunningham	Member for Geelong; 1886–1892	Succeeded by John Rout Hopkins
