= Australian banking crisis of 1893 =

19th-century financial crisis in Australia

The 1893 banking crisis in the Australian colonies involved the collapse of a considerable number of commercial banks and building societies, and a general economic depression. It occurred at the same time as the US Panic of 1893 (1893–1897).

== Foundations ==
During the 1880s, there had been a speculative boom in the Australian property market. The optimistic climate was fostered by the commercial banks, and also led to the proliferation of non-bank institutions such as building societies; as they were operating in a free banking system, there were few legal restrictions on their operations, and there was no central bank or government-provided deposit guarantees. Consequently, these banks and related bodies lent extravagantly, for property development in particular, but following the collapse of the land boom after 1888, a large number of enterprises that had borrowed money found themselves unable to repay these debts, and many began to declare bankruptcy.

== Crisis ==
Banks and non-bank institutions came under increasing financial pressure, and the full extent of the crisis became apparent when the Federal Bank of Australia failed on 30 January 1893. The situation was particularity acute in Victoria, and on 1 May 1893, the Victorian government implemented a five-day bank holiday to ameliorate the financial panic and prevent any further run on the banks. By 17 May, 11 commercial banks in Sydney, Melbourne, as well as other locations in Australia, had temporarily or permanently closed their doors.

The banks and other financial institutions affected included:

- August 1891 – Bank of Van Diemen's Land
- September 1891 – Mutual Provident, Land, Investing, and Building Society
- February 1892 – Toowoomba Deposit Bank
- March 1892 – Mercantile Bank of Australia
- July 1892 – Victoria Mutual Building and Investment Society
- February 1893 – Federal Bank, and the Queensland Deposit Bank.
- April/May 1893 – Within seventeen days, three banks collapsed: the Australian Joint Stock Bank, the Commercial Bank of Australia, and the English, Scottish and Australian Chartered Bank
- May 1893 – the Bank of North Queensland, the Brisbane Permanent Building and Banking Company, the City of Melbourne Bank, the Commercial Banking Company of Sydney, Federal Building, Land, and Investment Society, Limited, and Deposit Bank, the National Bank, the Queensland National Bank, and the Royal Bank of Queensland.

The City Bank of Sydney (absorbed by the Australian Bank of Commerce in 1917) is noted as one that did not close its doors.

== Critique ==
Whilst gold and securities were held by certain banks, many Australian institutions did not make representations to their London branches which held those deposits.

Criticisms were levelled at the directors:

The first result is that colonial banks have frequently opportunities for making larger profits in comparison with the volume of business than is possible with home banks. The second result arising from this possibility of larger profits is that there is a greater element of risk attaching to the business than attaches to the ordinary business of a British bank, and consequently need for greater caution in investments. It needs but a moment's consideration to reveal the fact that money advanced for the carrying on of our staple industry — the pastoral industry — is exposed to greater risk than money advanced on the comparatively steady staple businesses in Britain. Our staple industry is exposed to the caprices of climate and the invasion of insects, insignificant when considered singly but terribly significant when considered in the mass. Droughts, frequently recurring, blast the hopes of the pastoralist by robbing him of all prospect of return for his labour and anxieties, and that blasting of the squatter's hopes means loss to the institution which has advanced him money.

These comments of 1897 were made as the Federation Drought (1896 to 1902) commenced, which resulted in the widespread death of livestock and strains of livelihoods. There were some reforms to regulation and law with a view to preventing future abuse.

=== Social commentary ===
Poets of the time were critical of financial institutions, their profligate lending practices, and the misery resulting from their actions. In 1947, an author wrote, "Bankers' ruthlessness... were so much a feature of the 'Australian way of life' fifty years ago, that they brought words of burning protest from the pens of some of Australia's leading poets."

- E. J. Rupert Atkinson's In the bank

Here in this sacred place God is secure!
His golden blood, hence, here and hither drugs
Life. Ships, lands, cables, railways, roads, entice
Spoil to this great hushed temple; men immure
Their sons, all future hope here; here Death hugs,
Slimes and devours their gluttony and vice.

- Bernard O'Dowd's The mortgagee

We bring the wilderness to bounds;
We grub the land to roads.
In sour or sullen savage grounds
We sow Advance's seeds;
We grade the mountains, paint the hills
With patterned greenery,
And through Saharas lead the rills—
To feed the mortgagee.

- Will H. Ogilvie's Taken over (1895)

The banks are taking charge, old man ... I knew how it would be:
The Flags are flying halfmast high for death of Tringadee...

- Banjo Paterson's Kiley run

But droughts and losses came apace
To Kiley's run,
Till ruin stared him in the face;
He toiled and toiled while lived the light,
He dreamed of overdrafts at night;
At length, because he could not pay.
His bankers took his stock away
From Kiley's run.

... The owner lives in England now
Of Kiley's run.
He knows a racehorse from a cow;
But that is all he knows of stock;
His chiefest care is how to dock
Expenses, and he sends from town
To cut the shearers' wages down
On Kiley's run.

- Steele Rudd's When the bailiff brings a warrant

...Then you'll see a glorious future and you'll dream by night and day
Of corn and wheat and "taters" and such things that never pay;
And you wonder why they hang around the blessed town below
Till the bailiff brings a warrant and your cows have got to go—
Till your cows have got to go.

== People affected by the crisis ==
Austrian-born but Australian-based landscape artist Eugene von Guerard (1811–1901) had invested his finances in Australia. After moving to Europe in 1882, his wife died in 1891, and then he lost his investments in the 1893 crisis. This resulted in van Guerard living in poverty in Chelsea, London, England, until he died in 1901 aged 89.

== See also ==
- History of Australia (1851–1900)
- Banking in Australia
