= James Rose (Australian politician) =

Australian politician

James Marmaduke Rose (31 August 1849 – 18 August 1939) was an Australian politician.

Born in Melbourne to James and Mary Ann Rose, he attended Spring Street Model School and became a student teacher and Methodist minister. In 1869 he married Alice Fawkner in Fitzroy, with whom he had nine children; he later married Lucinda Dunlop Taylor. Rose was headmaster of Yarraville State School around 1873, but travelled to Edinburgh to study medicine, graduating in 1880. After a period as head resident surgeon at the Royal Infirmary of Edinburgh he returned to Williamstown and was appointed public vaccinator in 1883. In that year, however, he retired to take his seat in the Victorian Legislative Assembly as the member for North Melbourne, serving until 1889. Although he was considered a liberal at the time he had later associations with the nascent Labor Party. Rose died in Kew in 1939.
