= Matthew Henry Davies =

Australian politician (1850–1912)

The Honourable Sir Matthew Davies
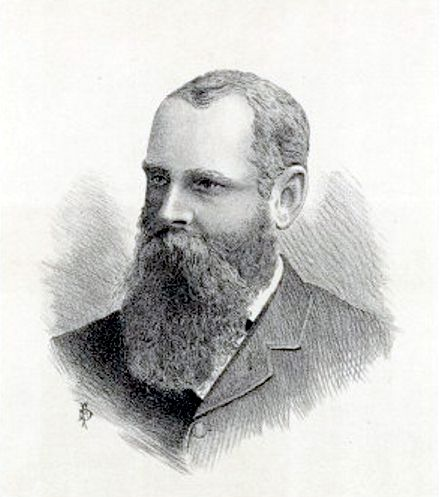

5th Speaker of the Victorian Legislative Assembly
- In office 4 October 1887 – April 1892
- Preceded by: Peter Lalor
- Succeeded by: Thomas Bent

Personal details
- Born: Matthew Henry Davies; 1 February 1850 Geelong, Colony of New South Wales
- Died: 26 November 1912 (aged 62) Mentone, Victoria
- Profession: Financier

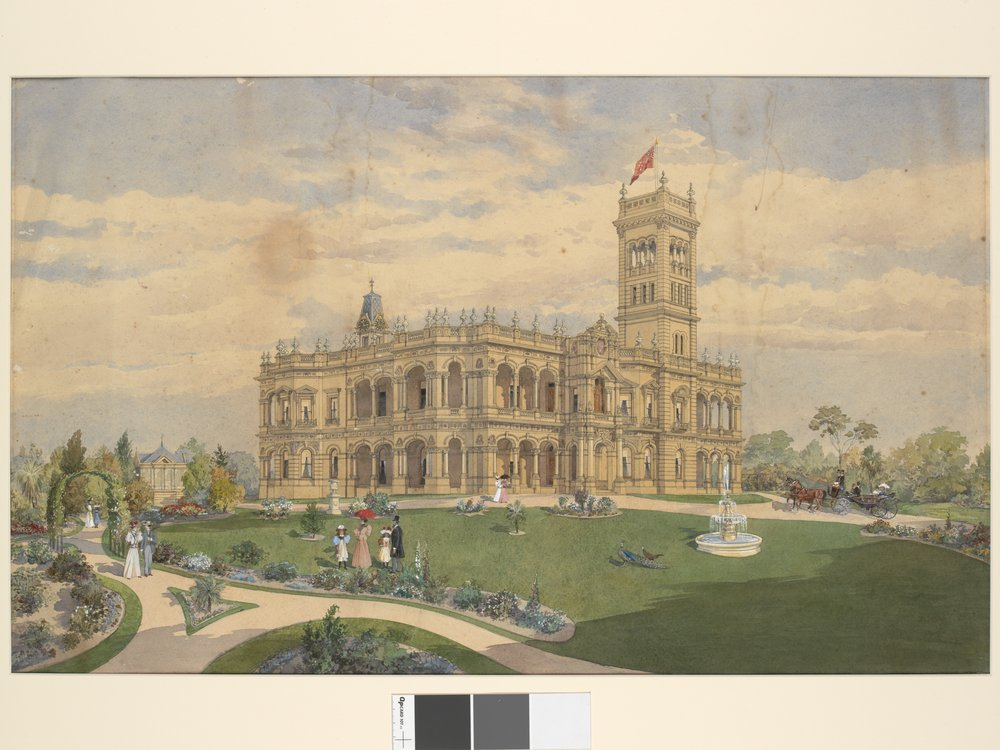
"Bracknell" was built for Davies on Lansell Rd, Toorak, in 1882, and massively extended five years later.

Sir Matthew Henry Davies (1 February 1850 – 26 November 1912) was an Australian politician, who served as Speaker of the Victorian Legislative Assembly. He was also a leading figure in the Victorian Land Boom, ending with his bankruptcy in 1894 and subsequent trial on fraud charges.

Davies was the son of Ebenezer Davies and his wife Ruth, daughter of Mark Bartlett, of Bracknell, Berkshire, England, and grandson of the Rev. John Davies, of Trevecca College, South Wales. He was born at Geelong in 1850, and educated at the Geelong College. He matriculated at the University of Melbourne in 1869. He was admitted a solicitor of the Supreme Court of Victoria in 1876, and married Elizabeth Locke Mercer, eldest daughter of the Rev. Peter Mercer, D.D., of Melbourne, a Presbyterian minister. They produced a family of seven: Arnold Mercer Davies (1876), Marion Agnes Davies (1877), Henry Gascoigne Davies (1879), Beatrice Elizabeth Davies (1880), Muriel Kate Davies (1882), Olive Blanche Davies (1884), and Cecil Harwood Locke Davies (1886).

For five years Davies was honorary secretary of the Council of the Law Institute of Victoria, and was a Justice of the Peace for the central bailiwick. He was mayor of the City of Prahran from 1881 to 1882. Davies represented St Kilda in the Victorian Legislative Assembly from 1883 to 1889. He was a member of the Royal Commission on Transfer of Land and Titles to Land in 1885, and, from 1886 to 1887, held a portfolio in the Gillies–Deakin Government as a minister without office.

In 1886, as a member of the Victorian government, Davies visited England in connection with the Colonial and Indian Exhibition. He was chairman of the Royal Commission on Banking in 1887, and was elected Speaker of the Legislative Assembly in October of that year. Marking the Golden Jubilee year of Queen Victoria's reign, he gave 10,000 pounds to the Imperial Institute and other public institutions. He was returned unopposed for Toorak in 1889, and unanimously re-elected Speaker in the same year. He was knighted in 1890.

Beginning in 1877, Davies had become a major land speculator, taking advantage of the spectacular increase in land values in Victoria during the boom decades that followed the Victorian Gold Rush of the 1850s. Ten years later, he controlled a network of forty companies, in which Victorian and overseas interests had invested millions of pounds. Like many other public figures, he was caught in the crash of early 1892, and his companies suspended payments in March. Davies resigned from Parliament and sailed to London to try to arrange finance to rescue his business empire, but was unsuccessful. He returned to Melbourne to face insolvency.

In January 1893 Davies was committed for trial on charges of conspiracy to defraud by means of a false balance sheet. The trial was delayed until May, at which point the Attorney-general, Sir Bryan O'Loghlen, withdrew the charges. He again travelled to London but, on the orders of the new Attorney-general, Isaac Isaacs, was arrested in Colombo and brought back to Melbourne. After several trials Davies was acquitted of the charges, but he was declared bankrupt in 1894 with personal debts of 280,000 pounds. His companies lost more than four million pounds – one of the largest corporate defaults in Australian history.

Davies returned to his legal practice, eventually restoring his reputation through community service.

Victorian Legislative Assembly
Preceded by Godfrey Carter; Joseph Harris	Member for St Kilda; 1883–1889; Served alongside: Joseph Harris	Succeeded by George Turner
District created	Member for Toorak; 1889–1892	Succeeded by Alexander McKinley
Preceded by Peter Lalor	Speaker of the Victorian Legislative Assembly; 1887–1892	Succeeded by Thomas Bent
