= Patrick Costello (Australian politician) =

Australian politician

Member of the Victorian Legislative Assembly
- In office 31 August 1861 – 1 November 1861
- Preceded by: John Sinclair
- Succeeded by: John Sinclair
- Constituency: North Melbourne

Personal details
- Born: 18 March 1824; County Leitrim, Ireland
- Died: 17 October 1896 (aged 72); Melbourne, Victoria, Australia
- Spouse: Catherine Donovan (m. 1847–1866)

Patrick Costello (18 March 1824 – 17 October 1896) was an Australian businessman and politician active in the Colony of Victoria.

Costello was born in County Leitrim, Ireland. He arrived in Melbourne when he was 17, through an assisted migration scheme. Costello made his fortune as a builder and contractor during the gold rush, and built a large home in Carlton. He was elected to the Melbourne City Council in 1855. Costello ran for the Victorian Legislative Assembly in 1859 and 1861, standing in the seat of North Melbourne and running on a liberal platform which included support for secular education and opposition to the Masters and Servants Acts. He was successful on his second attempt.

Costello was sworn into the Legislative Assembly on 31 August 1861, but was expelled two months later on 1 November after being convicted of electoral fraud. This was not in relation to his own election, but rather his actions in the Mornington seat, where he organised personation. Costello was sentenced to twelve months in prison, but received an early release on 31 March 1862. His business interests suffered as a result of his conviction, and he was declared insolvent in 1866. He did not become solvent again until 1891, but in the same year was elected to the Town of North Melbourne council; he served as mayor from 1892 to 1893.

Costello died in 1896, aged 72. He married Catherine Donovan in 1847, and had three children, but was widowed in 1866. His descendants include Peter and Tim Costello, both great-great-grandchildren.
