= Electoral district of North Melbourne =

Former state electoral district in Victoria, Australia

Coordinates: 37°47′57″S 144°56′48″E

North Melbourne Victoria—Legislative Assembly
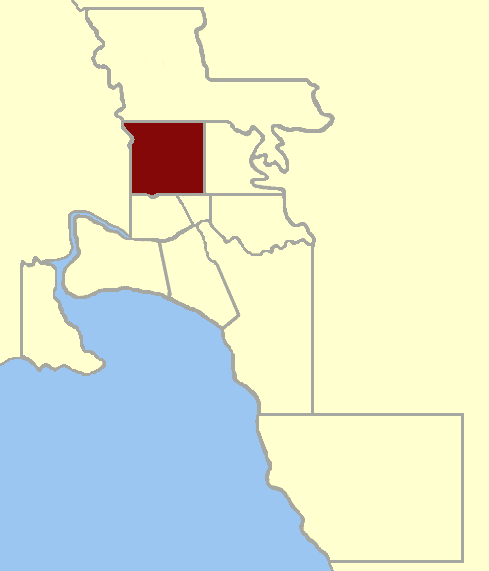
- Location within Greater Melbourne area, 1859
- State: Victoria
- Created: 1859
- Abolished: 1927
- Namesake: North Melbourne
- Demographic: Metropolitan

North Melbourne was an electoral district of the Legislative Assembly in the Australian state of Victoria from 1859 to 1927.

The Electoral District of North Melbourne was defined as being bound by Victoria Street/Parade on the south, Nicholson Street on the east, the southern boundary of portion 90, parish of Jika Jika on the north and a line south from Mains Bridge (now Flemington Bridge) to the Victoria Street alignment by the 1858 Electoral Districts Act. This included the suburbs of Carlton, Parkville and North Melbourne.

The district was abolished, along with several others, when the Electoral Districts Act 1926 was implemented in 1927.

== Members ==
Two members initially, one from the redistribution of 1889 when Port Melbourne and other districts were created.

Member 1	Term	Member 2	Term
John Sinclair	Oct 1859 – Jul 1861	George Elliott Barton	Oct 1859 – Jul? 1861
Patrick Costello	Aug 1861 – Nov 1861^{[x]}	John Davies	Aug 1861 – Aug 1864
John Sinclair	Nov 1861– Aug 1864	John Davies	Aug 1861 – Aug 1864
John Goulson Burtt	Nov 1864 – Mar 1874	William Robinson	Nov 1864 – Dec 1865
John Goulson Burtt	Nov 1864 – Mar 1874	John Harbison	Feb 1866 – Jan 1871
James Munro	May 1874 – Apr 1877	John Curtain	Apr 1871 – Apr 1877
John Laurens	May 1877 – Mar 1889	Joseph Storey	May 1877 – Mar 1881
John Laurens	May 1877 – Mar 1889	James Munro	Apr 1881^{[b]} – Feb 1883
John Laurens	May 1877 – Mar 1889	James Rose	Feb 1883 – Mar 1889

Single Member District 1889–1927
Member	Party	Term
John Laurens	Unaligned	1889–1892
David Wyllie	Unaligned	1892–1893
Sylvanus Reynolds^{[b]}	Unaligned	1893–1894
George Prendergast	Labour	1894–1897
William Watt	Unaligned	1897–1900
George Prendergast	Labor	1900–1927

^{b} = by-election
^{x} = expelled

Prendergast went on to represent the Electoral district of Footscray, which was re-created in 1927.
