= Olive Blanche Davies =

Australian artist (1884–1976/7)

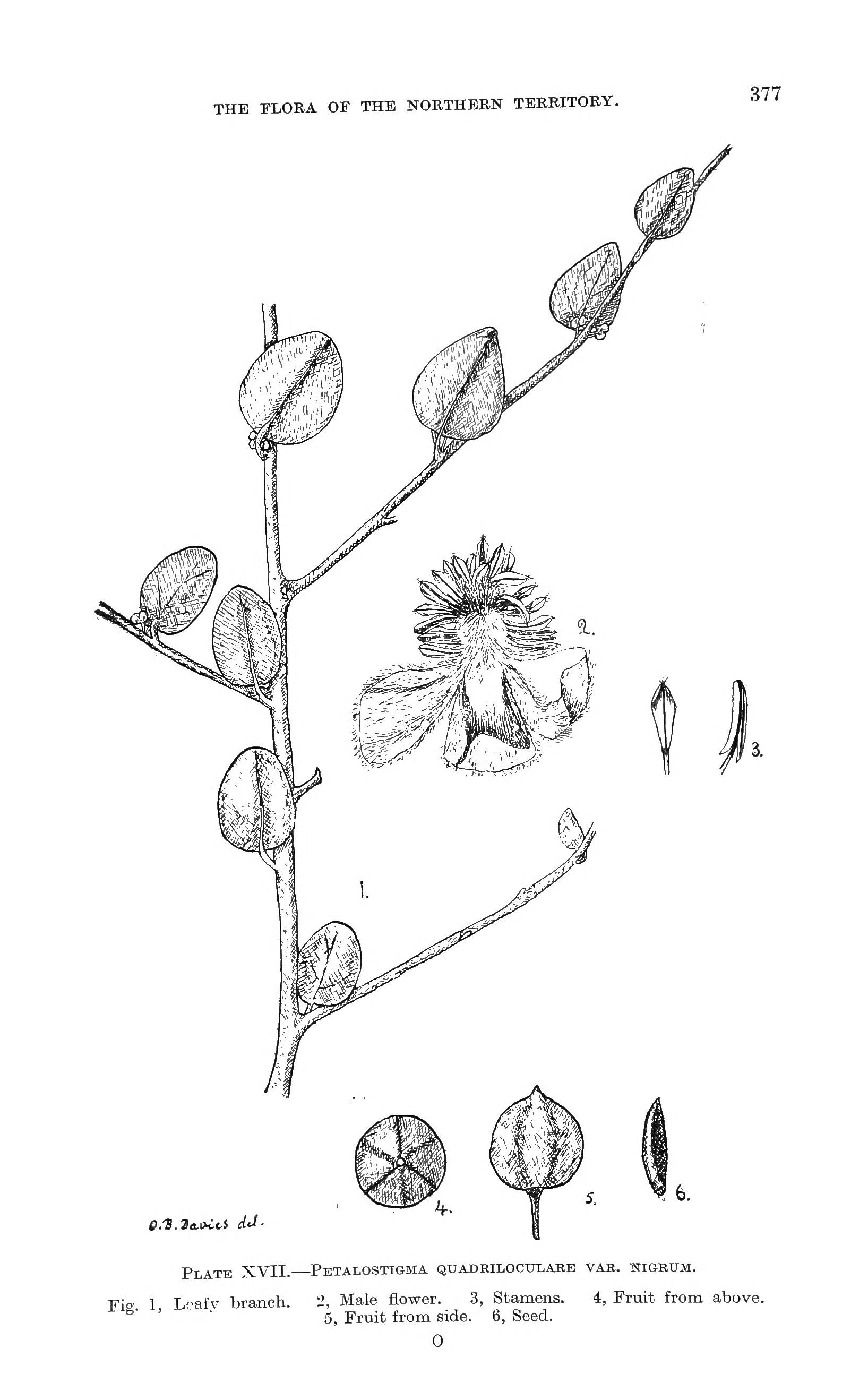
Petalostigma quadriloculare from Flora of the Northern Territory

Olive Blanche Davies MSc (27 October 1884 – 20 October 1976) was an Australian botanist and botanical artist who co-authored with Alfred Ewart the 1917 book The Flora of the Northern Territory. She made many of the illustrations.

Olive was born on 27 October 1884 in Toorak, Victoria, the youngest of six children of Elizabeth Locke Mercer (*c1850) from Kirkcudbright and Sir Matthew Henry Davies (1850–1912) of Geelong.

She was a government research scholar studying biology at Melbourne University, and wrote a paper in 1911 on Petterd's semi-slug Cystopelta petterdi, and another in 1914 on Caryodes dufresnii, a large land mollusk native to Tasmania.

On 22 December 1915 at 'Cluden', in Brighton, Australia, Olive Blanche Davies married Arthur Lyle Rossiter, a lieutenant in the Australian Expeditionary Force, and elder son of Edward Lyle Rossiter of Elsternwick. Arthur had been born in 1888 in Ballarat By the end of World War I he had risen to the rank of captain, and after the war he gave a lecture on gas warfare at Melbourne University, from which he had graduated an MSc. in 1911 and had been a demonstrator in physics from 1913. He had served as a gas officer in the 4th Australian Division in France. In 1924 he was appointed on a temporary basis as senior master at Melbourne High School. She died in Adelaide on 20 October 1976.
