= Electoral results for the district of Brighton =

Victoria, Australia, district election results

This is a list of electoral results for the district of Brighton in Victorian state elections.

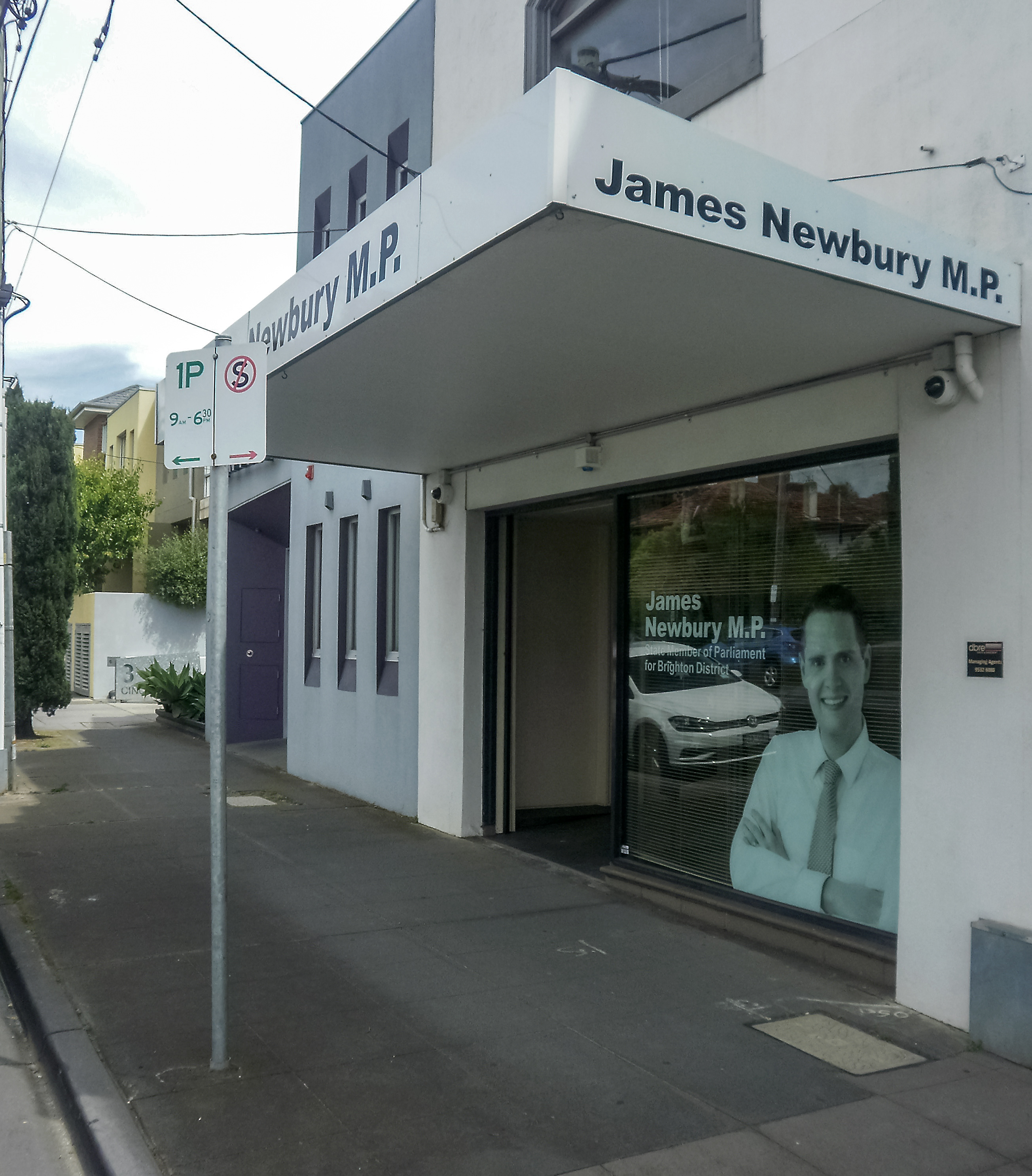
James Newbury's office in Brighton, Victoria

== Members for Brighton ==
Member	Party	Term
Jonathan Binns Were	Unaligned	1856–1857
Charles Ebden	Unaligned	1857–1861
George Higinbotham	Unaligned	1861-1861
William Brodribb	Unaligned	1861–1862
George Higinbotham	Unaligned	1862–1871
Sir Thomas Bent	Unaligned	1871–1894
William Moule	Unaligned	1894–1900
Sir Thomas Bent	Unaligned	1900–1909
Oswald Snowball	Liberal	1909–1917
Oswald Snowball	Nationalist	1917–1924
Oswald Snowball	Australian Liberal	1924–1927
Oswald Snowball	Independent Nationalist	1927–1928
Ian Macfarlan	Nationalist	1928–1931
Ian Macfarlan	United Australia	1931–1937
Ian Macfarlan	Independent	1937–1943
Ian Macfarlan	United Australia	1943–1945
Ian Macfarlan	Liberal	1945
Ray Tovell	Liberal	1945–1955
Ray Tovell	Electoral Reform League	1945–1955
Sir John Rossiter	Liberal	1955–1976
Jeannette Patrick	Liberal	1976–1985
Alan Stockdale	Liberal	1985–1999
Louise Asher	Liberal	1999–2018
James Newbury	Liberal	2018–present

== Election results ==
=== Elections in the 2020s ===
==== 2022 ====
2022 Victorian state election: Brighton
Party	Candidate	Votes	%	±%
Liberal	James Newbury	18,791	45.6	+0.8
Labor	Louise Crawford	10,164	24.7	−7.4
Greens	Sarah Dekiere	5,680	13.8	−1.1
Independent	Felicity Frederico	3,749	9.1	+9.1
Independent	Sally Gibson	941	2.3	+2.3
Animal Justice	Alicia Walker	851	2.1	−2.8
Family First	Nick Sciola	558	1.4	+1.4
Ind. (Protector)	John Tiger Casley	251	0.6	−0.2
Independent	Allan L. Timms	211	0.5	+0.5
Total formal votes		41,196	95.8	+0.1
Informal votes		1,786	4.2	−0.1
Turnout		42,982	89.1	+1.5
Two-party-preferred result
Liberal	James Newbury	22,710	55.1	+4.6
Labor	Louise Crawford	18,486	44.9	−4.6
Liberal hold		Swing	+4.6	

=== Elections in the 2010s ===
==== 2018 ====
2018 Victorian state election: Brighton
Party	Candidate	Votes	%	±%
Liberal	James Newbury	17,597	45.40	−10.12
Labor	Declan Martin	12,193	31.46	+7.90
Greens	Katherine Copsey	5,854	15.10	−2.28
Animal Justice	Cathy Taylor	1,961	5.06	+5.06
Sustainable Australia	Alison Pridham	881	2.27	+2.27
Independent	John Tiger Casley	273	0.70	+0.70
Total formal votes		38,759	95.81	−0.59
Informal votes		1,697	4.19	+0.59
Turnout		40,456	89.46	−2.59
Two-party-preferred result
Liberal	James Newbury	19,812	51.12	−8.66
Labor	Declan Martin	18,947	48.88	+8.66
Liberal hold		Swing	−8.66	

==== 2014 ====
2014 Victorian state election: Brighton
Party	Candidate	Votes	%	±%
Liberal	Louise Asher	21,145	55.5	−3.0
Labor	Louise Crawford	8,973	23.6	+3.5
Greens	Margaret Beavis	6,619	17.4	+0.1
Independent	Jane Touzeau	1,350	3.5	+3.5
Total formal votes		38,087	96.4	−0.1
Informal votes		1,425	3.6	+0.1
Turnout		39,512	92.1	−0.1
Two-party-preferred result
Liberal	Louise Asher	22,777	59.8	−4.6
Labor	Louise Crawford	15,330	40.2	+4.6
Liberal hold		Swing	−4.6	

==== 2010 ====
2010 Victorian state election: Brighton
Party	Candidate	Votes	%	±%
Liberal	Louise Asher	21,375	62.51	+7.60
Labor	Tom Daley	6,661	19.48	−6.27
Greens	Margaret Beavis	5,465	15.98	+2.69
Family First	Laurence Giddings	353	1.03	−0.77
Independent	A.L. Thompson	343	1.00	+1.00
Total formal votes		34,197	96.57	−0.57
Informal votes		1,215	3.43	+0.57
Turnout		35,412	92.30	+0.59
Two-party-preferred result
Liberal	Louise Asher	23,091	67.56	+6.63
Labor	Tom Daley	11,089	32.44	−6.63
Liberal hold		Swing	+6.63	

=== Elections in the 2000s ===
==== 2006 ====
2006 Victorian state election: Brighton
Party	Candidate	Votes	%	±%
Liberal	Louise Asher	18,067	54.91	+1.72
Labor	Jane Shelton	8,473	25.75	−5.14
Greens	Jonathan Walters	4,372	13.29	−2.63
Independent	Clifford Hayes	1,398	4.25	+4.25
Family First	Mark Freeman	592	1.80	+1.80
Total formal votes		32,902	97.14	−0.53
Informal votes		968	2.86	+0.53
Turnout		33,870	91.71	+1.58
Two-party-preferred result
Liberal	Louise Asher	20,041	60.93	+3.52
Labor	Jane Shelton	12,853	39.07	−3.52
Liberal hold		Swing	+3.52	

==== 2002 ====
2002 Victorian state election: Brighton
Party	Candidate	Votes	%	±%
Liberal	Louise Asher	17,094	53.2	−4.2
Labor	Rachelle Sapir	9,926	30.9	+6.3
Greens	Clive Davies	5,116	15.9	+15.9
Total formal votes		32,136	97.7	−0.2
Informal votes		765	2.3	+0.2
Turnout		32,901	90.1	
Two-party-preferred result
Liberal	Louise Asher	18,447	57.4	−7.2
Labor	Rachelle Sapir	13,686	42.6	+7.2
Liberal hold		Swing	−7.2	

=== Elections in the 1990s ===
==== 1999 ====
1999 Victorian state election: Brighton
Party	Candidate	Votes	%	±%
Liberal	Louise Asher	17,701	57.9	−8.8
Labor	Irene Dunsmuir	6,973	22.8	−7.3
Independent	Alex Del Porto	5,920	19.4	+19.4
Total formal votes		30,594	97.9	−0.4
Informal votes		664	2.1	+0.4
Turnout		31,258	91.3	
Two-party-preferred result
Liberal	Louise Asher	20,061	65.6	−2.5
Labor	Irene Dunsmuir	10,529	34.4	+2.5
Liberal hold		Swing	−2.5	

==== 1996 ====
1996 Victorian state election: Brighton
Party	Candidate	Votes	%	±%
Liberal	Alan Stockdale	20,299	66.6	−3.6
Labor	Mario Lucas	9,165	30.1	+6.5
Natural Law	Jacinta Lynch	1,009	3.3	−1.7
Total formal votes		30,473	98.2	+1.5
Informal votes		549	1.8	−1.5
Turnout		31,022	92.8	
Two-party-preferred result
Liberal	Alan Stockdale	20,738	68.1	−4.7
Labor	Mario Lucas	9,702	31.9	+4.7
Liberal hold		Swing	−4.7	

==== 1992 ====
1992 Victorian state election: Brighton
Party	Candidate	Votes	%	±%
Liberal	Alan Stockdale	20,936	70.3	+8.8
Labor	Leigh Jones	7,016	23.5	−12.4
Natural Law	Keith Pryor	1,491	5.0	+5.0
Pensioner and CIR	John Casley	355	1.2	+1.2
Total formal votes		29,798	96.7	−0.4
Informal votes		1,004	3.3	+0.4
Turnout		30,802	94.0	
Two-party-preferred result
Liberal	Alan Stockdale	21,686	72.8	+10.2
Labor	Leigh Johns	8,092	27.2	−10.2
Liberal hold		Swing	+10.2	

=== Elections in the 1980s ===
==== 1988 ====
1988 Victorian state election: Brighton
Party	Candidate	Votes	%	±%
Liberal	Alan Stockdale	16,651	61.88	−0.22
Labor	Jennifer Huppert	9,642	35.83	−2.07
Independent	John Casley	617	2.29	+2.29
Total formal votes		26,910	97.14	−0.28
Informal votes		792	2.86	+0.28
Turnout		27,702	92.08	+0.14
Two-party-preferred result
Liberal	Alan Stockdale	16,968	63.05	+0.95
Labor	Jennifer Huppert	9,942	36.95	−0.95
Liberal hold		Swing	+0.95	

==== 1985 ====
1985 Victorian state election: Brighton
Party	Candidate	Votes	%	±%
Liberal	Alan Stockdale	17,301	62.1	+4.0
Labor	Leslie Heimann	10,560	37.9	+6.0
Total formal votes		27,861	97.4	
Informal votes		737	2.6	
Turnout		28,598	91.9	
Liberal hold		Swing	+3.8	

==== 1982 ====
1982 Victorian state election: Brighton
Party	Candidate	Votes	%	±%
Liberal	Jeannette Patrick	13,807	57.8	−4.9
Labor	Garry Moore	7,804	32.7	−4.6
Democrats	George Dart	2,263	9.5	+9.5
Total formal votes		23,874	98.3	+0.7
Informal votes		418	1.7	−0.7
Turnout		24,292	93.6	+2.2
Two-party-preferred result
Liberal	Jeannette Patrick	14,769	61.9	−0.8
Labor	Garry Moore	9,108	38.1	+0.8
Liberal hold		Swing	−0.8	

=== Elections in the 1970s ===
==== 1979 ====
1979 Victorian state election: Brighton
Party	Candidate	Votes	%	±%
Liberal	Jeannette Patrick	15,260	62.7	+0.9
Labor	Christopher Kennedy	9,062	37.3	+8.6
Total formal votes		24,322	97.6	−0.5
Informal votes		598	2.4	+0.5
Turnout		24,920	91.4	−0.9
Liberal hold		Swing	−5.4	

==== 1976 ====
1976 Victorian state election: Brighton
Party	Candidate	Votes	%	±%
Liberal	Jeannette Patrick	15,925	61.8	+3.9
Labor	Robert Gerrand	7,404	28.7	+0.3
Australia	Ian Mullins	1,267	4.9	+4.9
Democratic Labor	Peter Lawlor	1,168	4.5	−0.9
Total formal votes		25,764	98.1	
Informal votes		492	1.9	
Turnout		26,256	92.3	
Two-party-preferred result
Liberal	Jeannette Patrick	17,533	68.1	−0.3
Labor	Robert Gerrand	8,231	31.9	+0.3
Liberal hold		Swing	−0.3	

==== 1973 ====
1973 Victorian state election: Brighton
Party	Candidate	Votes	%	±%
Liberal	John Rossiter	13,807	58.5	+14.8
Labor	Peter Hansen	6,372	27.0	−4.4
Australia	Frederick Funnell	2,150	9.1	+9.1
Democratic Labor	Peter Lawlor	1,285	5.4	−3.7
Total formal votes		23,614	98.0	+0.2
Informal votes		471	2.0	−0.2
Turnout		24,085	93.1	+0.1
Two-party-preferred result
Liberal	John Rossiter	15,975	67.7	+2.1
Labor	Peter Hansen	7,639	32.3	−2.1
Liberal hold		Swing	+2.1	

==== 1970 ====
1970 Victorian state election: Brighton
Party	Candidate	Votes	%	±%
Liberal	John Rossiter	9,812	43.7	−16.3
Labor	Peter Hansen	7,048	31.4	+4.6
Independent	Malcolm Wallace-Mitchell	3,562	15.8	+15.8
Democratic Labor	Keith Linard	2,053	9.1	−4.0
Total formal votes		22,475	97.8	+0.3
Informal votes		516	2.2	−0.3
Turnout		22,991	93.0	−0.4
Two-party-preferred result
Liberal	John Rossiter	14,742	65.6	−5.6
Labor	Peter Hansen	7,733	34.4	+5.6
Liberal hold		Swing	−5.6	

=== Elections in the 1960s ===
==== 1967 ====
1967 Victorian state election: Brighton
Party	Candidate	Votes	%	±%
Liberal	John Rossiter	13,661	60.0	−5.0
Labor	Bill Walsh	6,106	26.8	+4.0
Democratic Labor	John Wagstaff	2,984	13.1	+0.9
Total formal votes		22,751	97.5	
Informal votes		584	2.5	
Turnout		23,335	93.4	
Two-party-preferred result
Liberal	John Rossiter	16,198	71.2	−4.2
Labor	Bill Walsh	6,553	28.8	+4.2
Liberal hold		Swing	−4.2	

==== 1964 ====
1964 Victorian state election: Brighton
Party	Candidate	Votes	%	±%
Liberal and Country	John Rossiter	11,727	61.0	+2.7
Labor	Andrew Reid	5,000	26.0	−1.7
Democratic Labor	Edwin McSweeney	2,481	12.9	−1.0
Total formal votes		19,208	98.4	+0.1
Informal votes		310	1.6	−0.1
Turnout		19,518	92.4	−1.3
Two-party-preferred result
Liberal and Country	John Rossiter	13,836	72.0	+1.8
Labor	Andrew Reid	5,372	28.0	−1.8
Liberal and Country hold		Swing	+1.8	

==== 1961 ====
1961 Victorian state election: Brighton
Party	Candidate	Votes	%	±%
Liberal and Country	John Rossiter	11,218	58.3	−8.7
Labor	Geoffrey Blunden	5,333	27.7	−5.3
Democratic Labor	Edwin McSweeney	2,678	13.9	+13.9
Total formal votes		19,229	98.3	−0.1
Informal votes		323	1.7	+0.1
Turnout		19,552	93.7	0.0
Two-party-preferred result
Liberal and Country	John Rossiter	13,494	70.2	+3.2
Labor	Geoffrey Blunden	5,735	29.8	−3.2
Liberal and Country hold		Swing	+3.2	

=== Elections in the 1950s ===
==== 1958 ====
1958 Victorian state election: Brighton
Party	Candidate	Votes	%	±%
Liberal and Country	John Rossiter	13,250	67.0	
Labor	Reginald Hayes	6,537	33.0	
Total formal votes		19,787	98.4	
Informal votes		317	1.6	
Turnout		20,104	93.7	
Liberal and Country hold		Swing		

==== 1955 ====
1955 Victorian state election: Brighton
Party	Candidate	Votes	%	±%
Liberal and Country	John Rossiter	9,363	53.3	
Victorian Liberal	Ray Tovell	4,947	28.1	
Independent Labor	Marcella Sullivan	3,269	18.6	
Total formal votes		17,579	98.1	
Informal votes		347	1.9	
Turnout		17,926	92.7	
Two-candidate-preferred result
Liberal and Country	John Rossiter	10,998	62.6	
Victorian Liberal	Ray Tovell	6,581	37.4	
Liberal and Country gain from Victorian Liberal		Swing		

==== 1952 ====
1952 Victorian state election: Brighton
Party	Candidate	Votes	%	±%
Electoral Reform	Ray Tovell	12,167	48.2	+48.2
Independent	Allistair Bruce	5,786	22.9	+22.9
Liberal and Country	Raymond Trickey	4,874	19.3	−80.7
Independent	Grace Stratton	1,244	4.9	+4.9
Independent	Finlay Julyan	1,174	4.7	+4.7
Total formal votes		25,245	97.6	
Informal votes		631	2.4	
Turnout		25,876	94.0	
Two-candidate-preferred result
Electoral Reform	Ray Tovell	15,729	62.3	+62.3
Independent	Allistair Bruce	9,516	37.7	+37.7
Electoral Reform gain from Liberal and Country		Swing	N/A	

==== 1950 ====
1950 Victorian state election: Brighton
Party	Candidate	Votes	%	±%
Liberal and Country	Ray Tovell	unopposed		
Liberal and Country hold		Swing		

=== Elections in the 1940s ===
==== 1947 ====
1947 Victorian state election: Brighton
Party	Candidate	Votes	%	±%
Liberal	Ray Tovell	16,464	65.2	+24.6
Independent	Ian Macfarlan	8,795	34.8	+34.8
Total formal votes		25,259	97.5	−1.2
Informal votes		659	2.5	+1.2
Turnout		25,918	93.2	+5.3
Liberal hold		Swing	N/A	

==== 1945 ====
1945 Victorian state election: Brighton
Party	Candidate	Votes	%	±%
Liberal	Ray Tovell	9,040	40.6	
Labor	Val Doube	6,746	30.3	
Ministerial	Ian Macfarlan	6,499	29.2	
Total formal votes		22,285	98.7	
Informal votes		283	1.3	
Turnout		22,568	87.9	
Two-party-preferred result
Liberal	Ray Tovell	14,106	62.9	
Labor	Val Doube	8,269	37.1	
Liberal hold		Swing		

==== 1943 ====
1943 Victorian state election: Brighton
Party	Candidate	Votes	%	±%
United Australia	Ian Macfarlan	12,217	39.1	+9.6
Labor	Robert Gault	9,716	31.2	+31.2
Ind. United Australia	John Warren	9,240	29.6	+29.6
Total formal votes		31,173	98.0	+0.2
Informal votes		648	2.0	−0.2
Turnout		31,821	88.4	−5.8
Two-party-preferred result
United Australia	Ian Macfarlan	20,211	64.8	
Labor	Robert Gault	10,962	35.2	
United Australia gain from Independent		Swing	N/A	

- Sitting member Ian Macfarlan returned to the UAP after winning the seat in the previous election as an Independent.

==== 1940 ====
1940 Victorian state election: Brighton
Party	Candidate	Votes	%	±%
Independent	Ian Macfarlan	16,507	57.2	+57.2
United Australia	Robert Breen	8,519	29.5	−52.5
Independent	John Warren	3,845	13.3	+13.3
Total formal votes		28,871	97.8	0.0
Informal votes		662	2.2	0.0
Turnout		29,533	94.2	+1.5
Independent gain from United Australia		Swing	N/A	

- Preferences were not distributed.

=== Elections in the 1930s ===
==== 1937 ====
1937 Victorian state election: Brighton
Party	Candidate	Votes	%	±%
United Australia	Ian MacFarlan	21,539	82.0	+30.9
Communist	Gerald O'Day	4,737	18.0	+18.0
Total formal votes		26,276	97.8	−0.6
Informal votes		593	2.2	+0.6
Turnout		26,869	92.7	−2.3
United Australia hold		Swing	N/A	

==== 1935 ====
1935 Victorian state election: Brighton
Party	Candidate	Votes	%	±%
United Australia	Ian Macfarlan	12,786	51.1	−48.9
Independent	Edmund Herring	12,258	48.9	+48.9
Total formal votes		25,044	98.4	
Informal votes		398	1.6	
Turnout		25,442	95.0	
United Australia hold		Swing	N/A	

==== 1932 ====
1932 Victorian state election: Brighton
Party	Candidate	Votes	%	±%
United Australia	Ian Macfarlan	unopposed		
United Australia hold		Swing		

=== Elections in the 1920s ===
==== 1929 ====
1929 Victorian state election: Brighton
Party	Candidate	Votes	%	±%
Nationalist	Ian Macfarlan	10,460	46.2	−53.8
Independent	Richard Tracey	5,141	22.7	+22.7
Independent	Angela Booth	3,668	16.2	+16.2
Independent	Jeremiah Grant	3,359	14.8	+14.8
Total formal votes		22,628	97.7	
Informal votes		535	2.3	
Turnout		23,163	94.4	
Nationalist	Ian Macfarlan	11,342	50.1	
Independent	Richard Tracey	5,750	25.4	
Independent	Angela Booth	5,536	24.5	
Nationalist hold		Swing		

- Preferences were not distributed to completion.

==== 1928 by-election ====
1928 Brighton state by-election
Party	Candidate	Votes	%	±%
Labor	William Finlayson	4,262	22.6	
Independent	Eleanor Glencross	3,985	21.1	
Nationalist	Ian Macfarlan	3,920	20.8	
Nationalist	Henry Abbott	1,554	8.2	
Nationalist	Alfred Kelly	1,445	7.7	
Nationalist	James Ramsay	1,280	6.8	
Nationalist	Henry Hall	1,037	5.5	
Australian Liberal	Daniel Hoban	823	4.4	
Independent	Martin Hannah	340	1.8	
Independent	Thomas Ryan	193	1.0	
Total formal votes		18,839	93.8	
Informal votes		1,243	6.2	
Turnout		20,082	88.6	
Two-candidate-preferred result
Nationalist	Ian Macfarlan	9,685	51.4	
Independent	Eleanor Glencross	9,154	48.6	
Nationalist gain from Ind. Nationalist		Swing	N/A	

==== 1927 ====
1927 Victorian state election: Brighton
Party	Candidate	Votes	%	±%
Ind. Nationalist	Oswald Snowball	unopposed		
Member changed to Ind. Nationalist from Australian Liberal		Swing	N/A	

==== 1924 ====
1924 Victorian state election: Brighton
Party	Candidate	Votes	%	±%
Australian Liberal	Oswald Snowball	10,692	64.6	+64.6
Nationalist	Henry Crowther	5,869	35.4	−64.6
Total formal votes		16.561	99.5	
Informal votes		88	0.5	
Turnout		16,649	54.5	
Member changed to Australian Liberal from Nationalist		Swing	N/A	

==== 1921 ====
1921 Victorian state election: Brighton
Party	Candidate	Votes	%	±%
Nationalist	Oswald Snowball	unopposed		
Nationalist hold		Swing		

==== 1920 ====
1920 Victorian state election: Brighton
Party	Candidate	Votes	%	±%
Nationalist	Oswald Snowball	8,658	64.9	−9.0
Nationalist	Robert Stephenson	4,685	35.1	+35.1
Total formal votes		13,343	94.0	−2.7
Informal votes		851	6.0	+2.7
Turnout		14,194	54.7	+6.7
Nationalist hold		Swing	N/A	

=== Elections in the 1910s ===
==== 1917 ====
1917 Victorian state election: Brighton
Party	Candidate	Votes	%	±%
Nationalist	Oswald Snowball	7,442	73.9	+1.6
Labor	Arthur Roth	1,814	18.0	−9.7
Nationalist	Frederick Leveson	815	8.1	+8.1
Total formal votes		10,071	96.7	−1.4
Informal votes		345	3.3	+1.4
Turnout		10,416	48.0	+6.8
Two-party-preferred result
Nationalist	Oswald Snowball		80.3	+8.0
Labor	Arthur Roth		19.7	−8.0
Nationalist hold		Swing	+8.0	

- Two party preferred vote was estimated.

==== 1914 ====
1914 Victorian state election: Brighton
Party	Candidate	Votes	%	±%
Liberal	Oswald Snowball	5,348	72.3	−27.7
Labor	Albert Andrews	2,048	27.7	+27.7
Total formal votes		7,396	98.1	
Informal votes		144	1.9	
Turnout		7,540	41.2	
Liberal hold		Swing	N/A	

==== 1911 ====
1911 Victorian state election: Brighton
Party	Candidate	Votes	%	±%
Liberal	Oswald Snowball	unopposed		
Liberal hold		Swing		

=== Elections in the 1900s ===
==== 1909 by-election ====
1909 Brighton state by-election
Party	Candidate	Votes	%	±%
Liberal	Oswald Snowball	3,362	60.3	−39.7
Independent Liberal	John Hamilton	1,170	31.8	+31.8
Labor	Daniel McNamara	439	7.9	+7.9
Total formal votes		3,571	99.94	N/A
Informal votes		35	0.06	N/A
Turnout		3,606	72.1	N/A
Liberal hold		Swing		
