= 1909 Brighton state by-election =

- 8 October 1909

Electoral district of Brighton in the Victorian Legislative Assembly
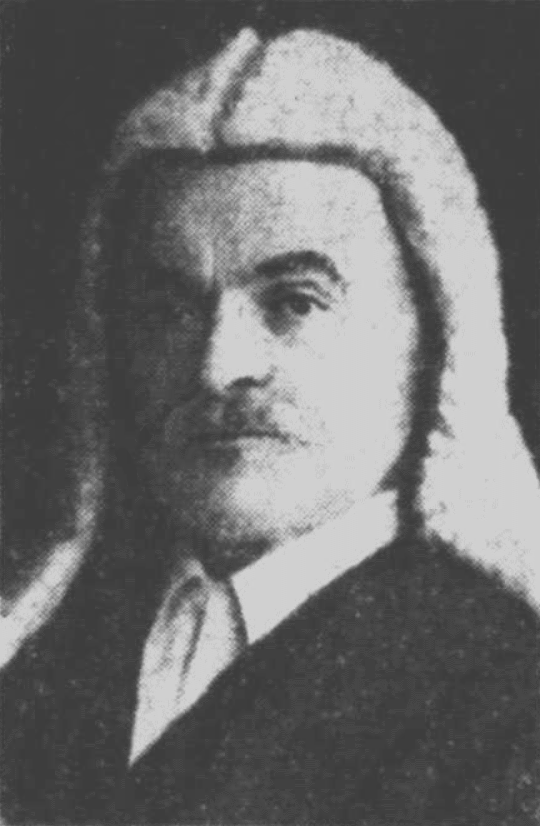
	First party	Second party	Third party
		IND	ALP
Candidate	Oswald Snowball	John Hamilton	Daniel McNamara
Party	Liberal	Independent Liberal	Labor
Popular vote	3,362	1,170	439
Percentage	60.3%	31.8	7.9
MP before election
Thomas Bent
Liberal
Elected MP
Oswald Snowball
Liberal

The 1909 Brighton state by-election was held on 8 October 1909 to elect the next member for Brighton in the Victorian Legislative Assembly, following the death of incumbent MP and former premier Thomas Bent.

Bent, who served as premier from February 1904 until January 1909, died on 17 September 1909 at his home in Bay Street, Brighton. He had been unopposed at the previous election in 1908.

Prior to the election, the United Liberal Party (which Bent had led in 1908) had merged with the Liberal Party. This led to the ULP splitting and the Liberal Party forming.

The by-election was won by Liberal candidate Oswald Snowball. Other candidates were Independent Liberal John Hamilton and future Labor MLC Daniel McNamara.

This was the first state election in Victoria in which women could vote.

== Results ==
1909 Brighton state by-election
Party	Candidate	Votes	%	±%
Liberal	Oswald Snowball	3,362	60.3	−39.7
Independent Liberal	John Hamilton	1,170	31.8	+31.8
Labor	Daniel McNamara	439	7.9	+7.9
Total formal votes		3,571	99.94	N/A
Informal votes		35	0.06	N/A
Turnout		3,606	72.1	N/A
Liberal hold		Swing		
