= 1928 Brighton state by-election =

- 24 April 1928

Electoral district of Brighton in the Victorian Legislative Assembly
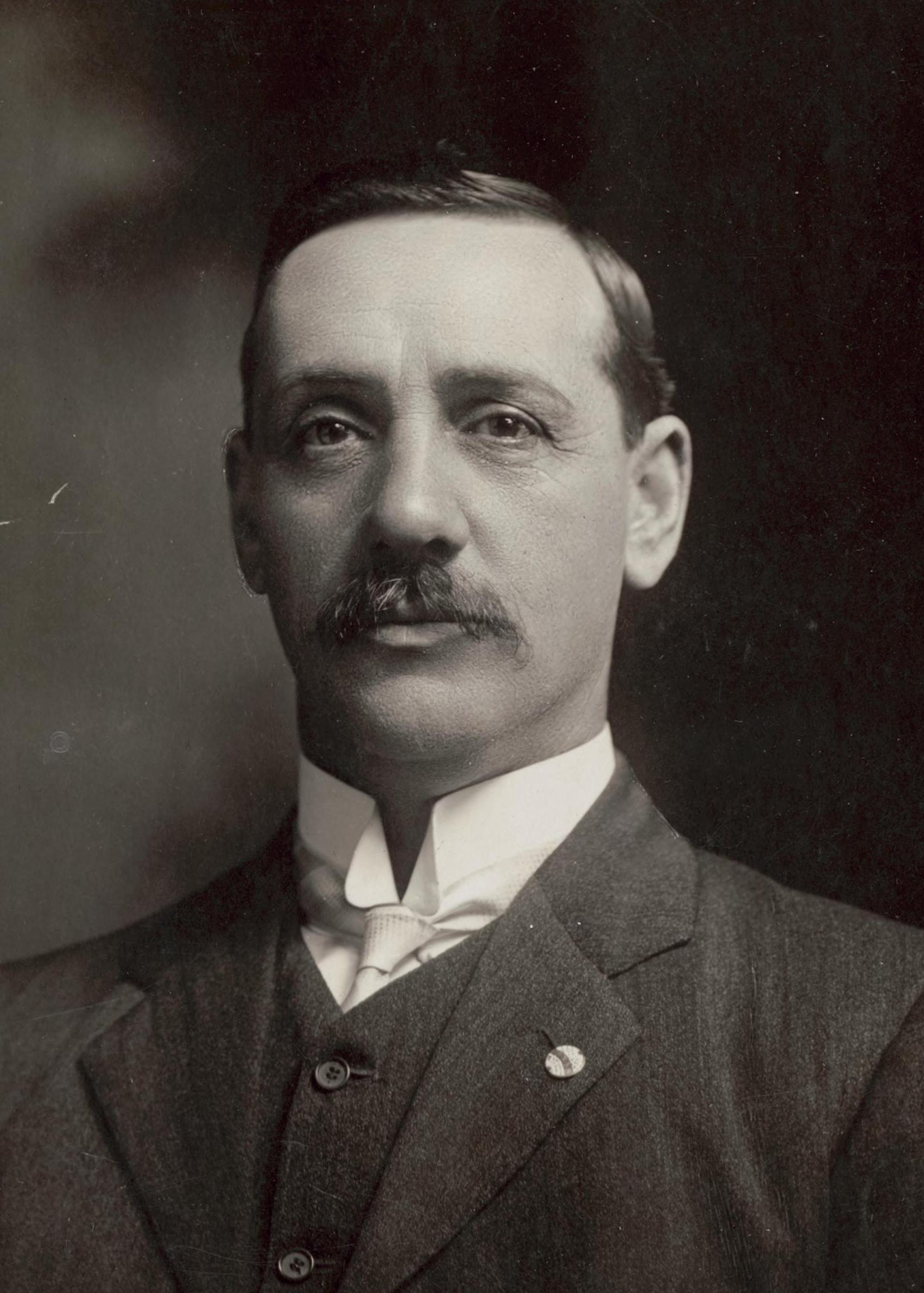

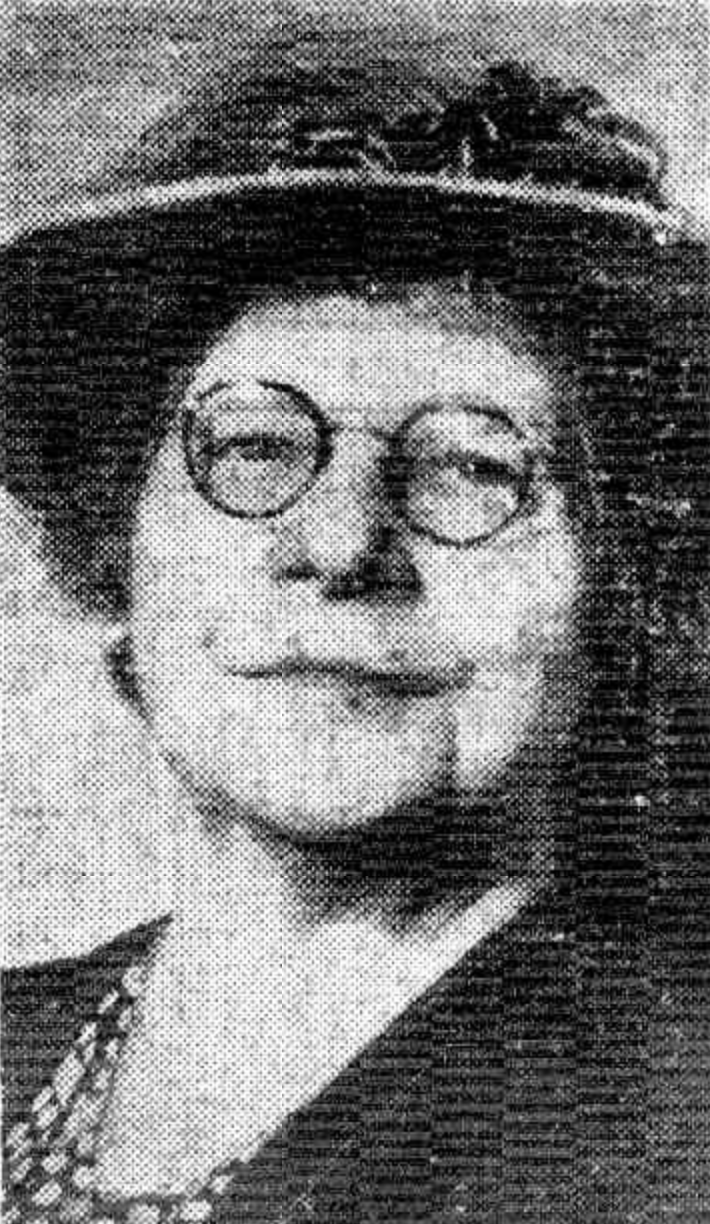

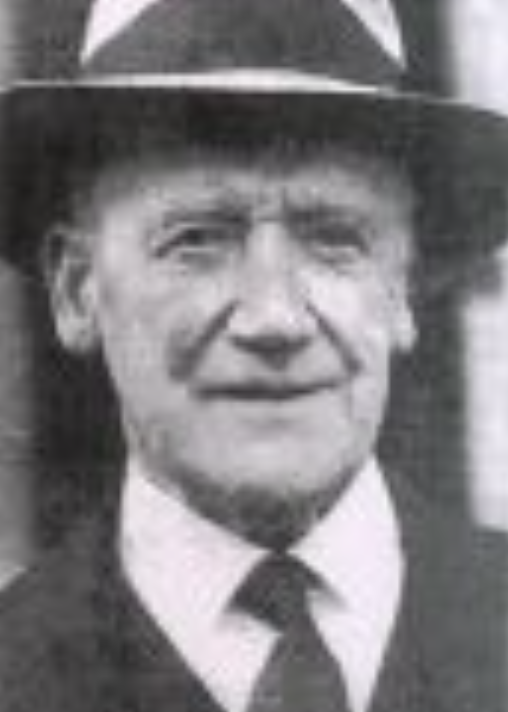
	First party	Second party	Third party
Candidate	William Finlayson	Eleanor Glencross	Ian Macfarlan
Party	Labor	Independent	Nationalist
Popular vote	4,262	3,985	3,920
Percentage	22.6%	21.1%	20.8%
2CP		48.6%	51.4%
MP before election
Oswald Snowball
Ind. Nationalist
Elected MP
Ian Macfarlan
Nationalist

The 1928 Brighton state by-election was held on 24 April 1928 to elect the next member for Brighton in the Victorian Legislative Assembly, following the death of incumbent MP Oswald Snowball.

Snowball, an Independent Nationalist who was also the Speaker of the Victorian Legislative Assembly, died on 16 March.

The by-election was won by Nationalist candidate and future premier Ian Macfarlan, who narrowly defeated feminist and housewives' advocate Eleanor Glencross.

== Results ==
1928 Brighton state by-election
Party	Candidate	Votes	%	±%
Labor	William Finlayson	4,262	22.6	
Independent	Eleanor Glencross	3,985	21.1	
Nationalist	Ian Macfarlan	3,920	20.8	
Nationalist	Henry Abbott	1,554	8.2	
Nationalist	Alfred Kelly	1,445	7.7	
Nationalist	James Ramsay	1,280	6.8	
Nationalist	Henry Hall	1,037	5.5	
Australian Liberal	Daniel Hoban	823	4.4	
Independent	Martin Hannah	340	1.8	
Independent	Thomas Ryan	193	1.0	
Total formal votes		18,839	93.8	
Informal votes		1,243	6.2	
Turnout		20,082	88.6	
Two-candidate-preferred result
Nationalist	Ian Macfarlan	9,685	51.4	
Independent	Eleanor Glencross	9,154	48.6	
Nationalist gain from Ind. Nationalist		Swing	N/A	
