= Walter Cresswell O'Reilly =

Australian public servant

Cresswell O'Reilly

Chief Commonwealth Film Censor
- In office November 1928 – June 1942
- Preceded by: Robert Wallace
- Succeeded by: J. O. Alexander

10th Mayor of Ku-ring-gai
- In office 19 March 1929 – 5 December 1933
- Deputy: Audley Hubert Brennan; James Briton; Ernest Selby
- Preceded by: George Christie
- Succeeded by: Ernest Selby

Alderman on Ku-ring-gai Municipal Council
- In office 10 December 1928 – January 1935
- In office 12 November 1944 – 14 December 1948

Councillor on Warringah Shire Council
- In office 14 November 1939 – 11 December 1941
- Preceded by: Frederick Latham
- Constituency: A Riding

Personal details
- Born: 6 June 1877 Sydney, New South Wales
- Died: 20 December 1954 (aged 77) Pymble, New South Wales, Australia
- Spouse: Ethel Jane Vickery
- Education: Newington College; University of Sydney

Walter Cresswell O'Reilly (6 June 1877 – 20 December 1954) was an Australian public servant who became Chief Commonwealth Film Censor. He "dominated and shaped Australian film censorship" and was able to "define appropriate mass entertainment" for nearly twenty years. He was the founding president of the National Trust of Australia (NSW) and an early urban conservationist.

== Early life ==
Cresswell O'Reilly (he was always known by his second name) was born in New South Wales to Irish-American physician Dr Walter William Joseph O’Reilly and his Ballarat-born wife, Mary Narcissa O’Reilly (née Taylor).

He was educated at Newington College (1894–1896) and the University of Sydney from where he graduated with a Bachelor of Arts in 1903. He married Ethel Jane Vickery, a granddaughter of philanthropist Ebenezer Vickery, in 1909.

== Army service ==
During World War I he served with the Australian Imperial Force in France as a gunner and then as a warrant officer, class 1, with the Army Education Service.

== Public service ==
Before attending university, O'Reilly had been a junior clerk in the Department of Justice. After the war, he returned to the public service as an officer-in-charge in the justice branch of the Attorney-General's Department. In 1925 O'Reilly was nominated by the Methodist Church, the YMCA, and the Businessmen's Efficiency League as the senior Commonwealth film censor in Sydney.

In this position he was de facto chief censor, as most films arrived in Australia through Sydney. Three years later he became chief Commonwealth censor and was reappointed annually. He was joined by Eleanor Glencross who was appointed after lobbying by women's organisations. She was replaced in 1930 by Gwendoline Dorothea Julie Hansen who was appointed for three years and then also reappointed annually. The third member of the board was Colonel LJ Hurley. Up until 1935 they were rejecting half of the films that were assigned for assessment. This proportion was relaxed as the US film industry imposed its own censorship in 1934. O'Reilly retired in 1942. As chief censor he introduced, in 1930, the classification system that graded films 'For General Exhibition' and 'Not Suitable for Children'.

O'Reilly was often involved in attempts to censor Australian films such as Forty Thousand Horsemen.

== Community service ==
O'Reilly was a Wesleyan and served as a trustee of Pymble Methodist Church for over 50 years, and was a choirmaster, Sunday-school-superintendent and lay preacher. He was elected to Ku-ring-gai Municipal Council as an alderman and as mayor from 1929 until 1933. As mayor his vision for the Upper North Shore involved what he called the two TPs — Town Planning and Tree Planting and hence he became known as the Tree Mayor. As an early conservationist he was president of the State branch of the Australian Forest League and a member of the Forestry Advisory Council. In 1945 he became the founding president of the New South Wales division of the National Trust of Australia. At Wesley College, University of Sydney he was a councillor and treasurer.

== Honours ==
- Cresswell O’Reilly Lookout – 1030–1066 Pacific Highway, Pymble

== Publications ==
- Wesley College (within the University of Sydney): a historical outline (Syd, 1956)
- Ku-ring-gai Shire: early history and development (Syd, 1948 & 1963)

== Bibliography ==
- I Bertrand – Film Censorship in Australia (Brisb, 1978)
- G Shirley and B Adams – Australian Cinema (Syd, 1983)
- Film Censorship Board – Annual Reports 1925–42
- Sydney Morning Herald – 17 June 1942

== See also ==
- Annie Forsyth Wyatt

Government offices
Preceded by Robert Wallace	Chief Commonwealth Film Censor; 1928 – 1941	Succeeded by J. O. Alexander
Civic offices
Preceded by George Christie	Mayor of Ku-ring-gai; 1929 – 1933	Succeeded by Ernest Selby
