= Winifred Kastner =

British-born Australian community leader

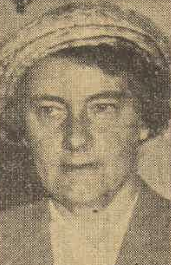
- in 1953
- Born: Winifred Stubbs; 29 June 1903; Chesterfield
- Died: 10 February 1987 (aged 83); Nedlands
- Education: Sheffield's school of art
- Occupation: community worker
- Employer(s): 6WF radio station Princess Margaret Hospital for Children
- Spouse: Eric Oscar Kastner
- Children: one

Winifred Kastner JP MBE born Winifred Stubbs (29 June 1903 – 10 February 1987) was a UK-born radio broadcaster, community leader and welfare worker in Australia. She was a leading figure in several organisations including the Country Women's Association and the Federated Association of Australian Housewives.

== Life ==
Kastner was born in the English East Midlands in the town of Chesterfield. She was the first child of Florence (born Blank) and Ernest Stubbs and she would have four siblings. Her father was a pattern-maker. She studied art in the nearby city of Sheffield from the age of sixteen and she qualified to teach arts and crafts. In 1930 she moved to Australia where she presented her skills on the 6WF radio station. The station was well known to rural women in Australia and in 1932 she joined the Country Women's Association and began touring rural areas demonstrating handicrafts on behalf of both the Country Women's Association and the 6WF radio station. At the end of that year she married and became Winifred Kastner at a church in Perth. She and taxi-driver Eric Oscar Kastner would have one child.

In 1940 was the President of the Perth branch of the Federated Association of Australian Housewives. In the same year she joined the Women's Service Guilds of Western Australia and in the same year she was chairing meetings to inspire Australian women to help with the war effort.

In 1945 she began her association with the Princess Margaret Hospital for Children where she organised handicrafts and book lending for their child patients. She was made Director of Handicrafts at the hospital.

In 1952 she (as President of the Women's Service Guilds of Western Australia) and Gertrude Rushton (as secretary) were involved with a deputation to the Australian premier and a public meeting to improve the rights of Aboriginal Australians. In the same year she became a Justice of the Peace and she volunteered her time for 24 years rising to be President of the Women Justices Association for the state. In 1953 she was speaking up for women's suffrage saying "It should be a woman's privilege to be tried, and governed, by 50 per cent of her own sex". In the same year she was one of about 11,000 Australians who received the Queen Elizabeth II Coronation Medal and in 1976 she was awarded an MBE.

== Death and legacy ==
In 1979 "Reflections : profiles of 150 women who helped make Western Australia's history" was published and Kastner was one of those 150 women. Kastner died in Nedlands in 1987.
