= Gladys Hain =

Australian lawyer, activist and journalist (1887–1962)

- the 5th woman lawyer in Victoria
- Born: Gladys Adeline Taylor; 1 July 1887; Maldon, Victoria
- Died: 6 March 1962 (aged 74); Carlton, Victoria
- Education: University of Melbourne
- Occupation: lawyer
- Known for: women's rights
- Spouse: Reginald "Rex" Edric Hain
- Children: daughters

Gladys Adeline Hain born Gladys Adeline Taylor (1 July 1887 – 6 March 1962) was an Australian lawyer, activist and journalist. She led the Federated Association of Australian Housewives and sat on a royal commission on housing law.

== Life ==
Hain was born in Maldon in Victoria. Her Australian born parents were Adeline Landsborough (born Nicholl) and her husband John Wightman Taylor – who was a teacher. Her education which mixed private and state education gained her entry into the University of Melbourne where she studied law until 1912 gaining a master's degree and a diploma in education aided by her total recall memory. In parallel she had served her articles in the practise of the lawyer and minister James Whiteside McCay allowing her to be the fifth woman to be admitted to the bar in Victoria.

She became a Melbourne solicitor and published a paper on the legal status of women. She emigrated to the UK to join her war injured husband, Lieutenant "Rex" Hain in 1916. She had married him in 1915 just before he joined the recently formed 23rd Battalion to serve at Gallipoli and in France. She occupied herself in England in voluntary work and writing. She wrote short stories about Bill Jim from the time he signed up in 1914. She captured an Australia take on volunteering to be a soldier. These stories became The Coo-ee Contingent which was published in 1917.

She, her husband and their daughter were back in Australia in 1921 where their second daughter was born. Rex who had studied the law, never fully recovered from the war, and he did not want her to return to being a solicitor. Hain took to journalism for The Argus and other newspapers. She had strong views and she continued her interest in the law and women's rights supplying legal advice to women's organisations.

Her husband died in 1947 and she returned to the law initially as a solicitor. She continued in her interest in women's rights and in 1952 she became the President of the Victoria branch of the Federated Association of Australian Housewives. She went on to lead the national organisation for six years trying to improve the lot for Australia's housewives and pressurising manufacturers and government to keep the price of basic foods low.

In 1956 she was one of three people appointed to look at housing law in Victoria. After 44 days of work they recommended a new body to deal with slums and the continuation of the Housing Commission of Victoria's Holmesglen Concrete House Project which was creating pre-fabricated concrete houses and buildings. Only the latter recommendation was implemented.

Hain died in Carlton, Victoria in 1962.

Hain Place, in the Canberra suburb of Gilmore, is named in her honour.
