= Gwendoline Hansen =

Australian film censor (1896–1971)

- Born: Gwendoline Dorothea Julie Nielson; 19 February 1896; Waverley
- Died: 7 January 1971 (aged 74); Concord Repatriation General Hospital
- Occupations: teacher, censor
- Employer: New South Wales Department of Public Instruction
- Known for: Australian film censor
- Spouse: Herbert William Hansen

Gwendoline Dorothea Julie Hansen MBE or Gwendoline Dorothea Julie Nielson (19 February 1896 – 7 January 1971) was an Australian film censor from 1930.

== Life ==
Gwendoline Dorothea Julie Nielson was born on 19 February 1896 in Waverley, New South Wales, the daughter and sixth child of Norwegian born Alfred Julius Nielson, an assayer, and Martha née Maxwell. She was educated at Parramatta High School. Aided by a scholarship she went to college to become a teacher.

She taught in schools employed by the New South Wales Department of Public Instruction starting in 1918. In 1922 she married Herbert William Hansen who was also a teacher but he was also a war veteran, Her new husband had been gassed during World War I, he died in 1928 and she returned to teaching.

Hansen was one of the many people who applied to be a film censor. Walter Cresswell O'Reilly had become the chief Commonwealth censor and he had been joined by housewife leader Eleanor Glencross who was appointed after lobbying by women's organisations. Glencross was replaced in 1930 by Hansen who was appointed for three years and then also reappointed annually. Glencross unsuccessfully claimed that Hansen was a political appointment and an investigation was made to ascertain if there was any basis for her claims. The fact that Hansen was a war-widow was well received as she was seen as representing the dependants of service people. The third member of the board was Colonel Lionel James Hurley. Up until 1935 the three censors were rejecting half of the films that were assigned to them for assessment. This proportion reduced as the US film industry increased its own censorship in 1934. O'Reilly retired in 1942 and he was replaced by John Alexander. Colin Campbell was the third and last chief censor she worked with. He was appointed in 1956 and Hansen retired in 1961 when she became a Member of the Most Excellent Order of the British Empire.

Hansen died in Sydney's Concord Repatriation General Hospital in 1971.
