= Chris McDiven =

Australian businesswoman (born 1949)

Christine Ann McDiven (born 10 September 1949 in Llandudno, Wales) is an Australian businesswoman.

Educated at Penrhos College (Colwyn Bay, UK) and Methodist Ladies College (WA) she trained as an infant teacher at Claremont Teachers College and Churchlands College of Advanced Education and taught in Western Australian primary schools, and owned a small business, before moving to Sydney in 1983.

With her background in small business and education Chris has served on a number of not-for-profit organisation's boards including Powerhouse Museum Fundraising Committee (Chairman 1991 – 1995); School Council Kambala (President 2001 – 2011); Association of Independent Schools (Director, 2007 – 2011); Schizophrenia Research Institute (Director from 2009, Chairman 2010 – 2014); and currently (2018) is the Chairman of the Together for Humanity Foundation and a Trustee of Sydney Living Museums.

Chris has also held many positions in the Liberal Party of Australia including President of the NSW Liberal Women's Council from 1991 to 1996; member of the NSW State Executive from 1989 to 2014, and State President from 2000 to 2005. During this period Chris initiated and co-ordinated the Liberal Women's Forum which has been widely credited with the increase in the number of Liberal women elected to State and Federal Parliament.

In 2005 she was elected the first female President of the Liberal Party of Australia. In February 2008 she was replaced as president by Alan Stockdale.

She also represented the Liberal Party overseas as the Australian member of the organising committee for the International Conference of Asian Political Parties (2007–2011) and the Chairman of the International Women's Democrat Union (2007–2010).

A member of the Rotary Club of Sydney since 1998, she chaired the Host Organising Committee for the Rotary International Presidential Peacebuilding Conference in Sydney on 17 March 2018. She has received two Rotary Paul Harris Fellows.

She was appointed as a Member in the General Division of the Order of Australia (AM) in 2011 for service to the Liberal Party and the community through education and women's organisations.

Party political offices
Preceded by Shane Stone	President of the Liberal Party; 25 June 2005 – 19 February 2008	Succeeded by Alan Stockdale
