= Agnes Goode =

Australian social and political activist

Agnes Knight Goode
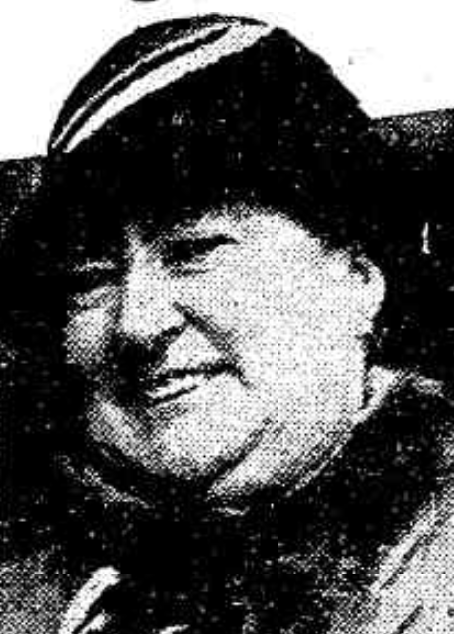
- Agnes Goode, c. 1932
- Born: Agnes Knight Fleming; January 31, 1872; Strathalbyn, South Australia
- Died: February 20, 1947 (aged 75); Toorak Gardens, South Australia
- Resting place: Cremated
- Other name: Mrs. A. K. Goode
- Occupations: Teacher; journalist; magistrate; local councillor; social and political activist
- Years active: 1893–1935
- Known for: first woman elected to a South Australian municipal council
- Political party: Liberal
- Spouse: William Edward Goode (m. 1896; died 1929)
- Children: 3
- Parent(s): James Fleming; Charlotte Fleming (née Knight)

Agnes Knight Goode, née Fleming (31 January 1872 – 20 February 1947), best known as Mrs. A. K. Goode, was an Australian social and political activist. A contemporary report called her "... a vigorous speaker, with a keen, logical mind and experience backed with sound commonsense, Mrs. Goode was until her later years frequently called on to take the public platform in support of social welfare movements."

== Early life ==
Born at Strathalbyn, South Australia, to storekeeper James Fleming (died 10 March 1913) and Charlotte, née Knight (died 22 January 1919), she won, in 1884, a bursary to attend Port Adelaide Model School and by 1893 had qualified as a teacher and was sent to Caltowie (between Gladstone and Jamestown) as a Provisional Teacher on Probation. In 1892, as part of her qualification, she completed a First Aid course conducted by the St. John Ambulance Association. She married sheep-farmer William Edward Goode (see below) at Port Lincoln on 11 July 1896; they had a daughter and two sons. She and the children moved to Adelaide in 1915.

== Social work ==
Agnes was founding vice-president of the Women's State Recruiting Committee during World War I and conceived the establishment of the advisory committee of soldiers' dependants. She was secretary (1916–1921) and president (1921–1922) of the Liberal Women's Educational Association. She was one of the first South Australian female Justices of the Peace from 1916, and the first to take her seat on the bench with the Stipendiary Magistrate. Her period presiding over the State Children's Court from 1919 gave her a reputation for severity; she famously made a 12-year-old boy who was convicted of stealing six bicycle chains a state ward for six years.

== Political career ==
Goode edited the women's page of the Liberal Leader from 1918 to 1924 and supported equal guardianship for mothers, women police, women in juries, equal pay, probation and the National Council for Women. In 1923 she was selected by the Liberal Federation in SA to stand for the Adelaide district seat in the House of Assembly, but was unsuccessful. In 1924 she was appointed "Official Visitor" to the Parkside Mental Asylum. In 1925 she was the first woman in South Australia to win a contest for election to a municipal council when she became a councillor of Hackney ward in the St. Peters Council, and was re-elected unopposed at the next election in 1929.

A perennial opponent of politician and publican A. A. Edwards, she unsuccessfully stood against him as a Liberal in 1924 for both the state and council elections:

Albert Augustine "Bert" Edwards (ca.1891–1963) was the antithesis of Mrs Goode; publican of the Brunswick Hotel, the Newmarket Hotel on North Terrace, the Hotel Victor at Victor Harbor, and stalwart of the West Adelaide Football Club. He was a member of the Labor Party. He served on the State Children's Council from 1924. A flamboyant dresser and acknowledged homosexual, he was an effective champion of poor and dispossessed men.

- Goode and Edwards were candidates for the seat of Adelaide in the House of Assembly elections in 1924. Edwards and fellow Labor Party candidates W. J. Denny and J. Dunn were successful; Goode came a distant fourth.
- Goode and Edwards were candidates for the Grey ward for the Adelaide City Council in 1924. Edwards topped the poll but had, as Mrs. Goode pointed out, contravened the Act by driving voters to the polling place. She refrained from formally charging him, as this could have given her the seat by default without a fair majority of votes.
- In 1925 Goode criticised as excessively lenient the jailing for one year of one Kelly, who was convicted of indecent assault. Edwards defended the judge, pointing out that the girl was a consenting party and above the age of consent. (more details needed)
- In 1927 Edwards criticised her for disallowing a proposed increase in allowances for "State girls" (wards of the State who were "boarded out" with generally well-to-do families or widows as companions and maids-of-all-work) from 2/ to 5/ (shillings) per week.

After being overlooked for the new Liberal Council in 1926 she left party politics and stood as a Non-Party Association candidate for Adelaide, contesting it again for the Liberal Federation in 1927. As President of the Liberal Federation's Adelaide women's branch, she contested the mayoralty in 1935, having continued her disputes with Edwards in the intervening years.

== Later life ==
Following her husband's death from cancer on 14 November 1929, Goode continued to be active in the community, contributing to societies for poetry, theatre, Aborigines (at their White's River station they employed a number of aboriginal workers, and were known as good employers), housewives (Mrs. Goode was closely associated over a long period with the Housewives' Association, she was the first president in South Australia in 1926, holding office again in 1930), unemployed women, travellers, local industries and kindergartens (she was a member of the executive committee and the organising committee of the Lady Gowrie Pre-School Centre, president of the Stepney Pre-School Nursery committee, and a delegate to the Australian Association for Pre-School Child Development).

She died at Toorak Gardens in 1947 of coronary occlusion and was cremated.

== Recognition ==
- She was associated with the Kindergarten Union in SA for more than 25 years, and in recognition of her service was elected a life vice-president.
- In 1947 the St. Peters Council agreed to rename the Stepney Free Kindergarten the "Agnes Goode Kindergarten" in her honour.

== Family ==
Agnes Knight Fleming married William Edward Goode on 11 July 1896.

William Edward Goode (ca.1857 – November 1929), husband of Mrs. A. K. Goode, was a well-known pastoralist of the West Coast of South Australia. His parents Mr W. and Mrs. Jane Nicol Goode (ca.1817 – 22 March 1901) (nee Hill; her brother was Captain Hill of the Buffalo) came to South Australia on the Asia in 1839. Their only child, he was born in Adelaide and educated at John L. Young's Adelaide Educational Institution, where he won prizes in 1866 and 1868. His father died when he was young, so he was brought up by an uncle, James Anderson, at White's River station, near Louth Bay, between Port Lincoln and Tumby Bay. Anderson and John Tennant were noted for bringing overland the first sheep to the area. Anderson returned to Scotland around 1895 (his wife had died there three years previously) and William managed the station for him, and at his uncle's death became owner of the property of around 10,000 acres, which he subdivided in 1907. Mr. Goode was involved in sheep breeding and bee farming, and it was through his advocacy that the first bee farms in the Port Lincoln district were started. He leased the farm to Mr. de Rose in 1908 then sold it around 1922 to George Proude. He died at his home in Payneham road, Stepney.

Their first child, a daughter, was named Katanya, an aboriginal term for "first born". Their children were:

- Nora Katanya Goode (18 March 1898 – 1975) married Frank Best on 19 July 1930. They were divorced in 1953.
- Evan Anderson Goode (11 September 1901 – 1980) studied law at the University of Adelaide and was admitted to the Supreme Court
- Bruce Fleming Goode (10 March 1903 – ) studied science at the University of Adelaide and graduated B.Sc.
