= Electricity Supply Industry Reform Unit =

The Electricity Supply Industry Reform Unit was established by the Victorian Government in 1994 within the Office of State Owned Enterprises in the Department of Treasury and Finance to advise the Government of Victoria (Australia) on the reform of Victoria's electricity industry.

It was established under the supervision of Treasurer Alan Stockdale, who wished to take the privitatisation efforts from the management of bureaucrats to external experts. The unit was led by British telecommunications engineer Peter Throughton.
