= Annie Forsyth Wyatt =

Australian community worker, conservationist, Red Cross worker (1885–1961)

Annie Forsyth Wyatt OBE
- Born: 3 January 1885; Redfern, New South Wales, Australia
- Died: 27 May 1961 (aged 76); St Ives, New South Wales
- Occupations: Community worker; conservationist; Red Cross worker

Annie Forsyth Wyatt (3 January 1885 – 27 May 1961) OBE was an Australian community worker, conservationist and Red Cross worker. She is celebrated as the driving force behind the establishment of the National Trust movement in Australia, establishing the organisation in 1945 to protect Sydney's historic natural and built sites.

As a conservationist, lover of colonial history, and humanitarian, Wyatt observed women working effectively in the community during World War I, and came to believe that women could make a difference in community issues. Over her lifetime she worked for many causes apart from the National Trust of Australia (NSW), including the Red Cross and the NSW Prisoners' Aid Association (for 20 years). She donated the proceeds of her book Doors that slam: a romance of early Sydney, to the Prisoners' Aid Association.

== Early life ==
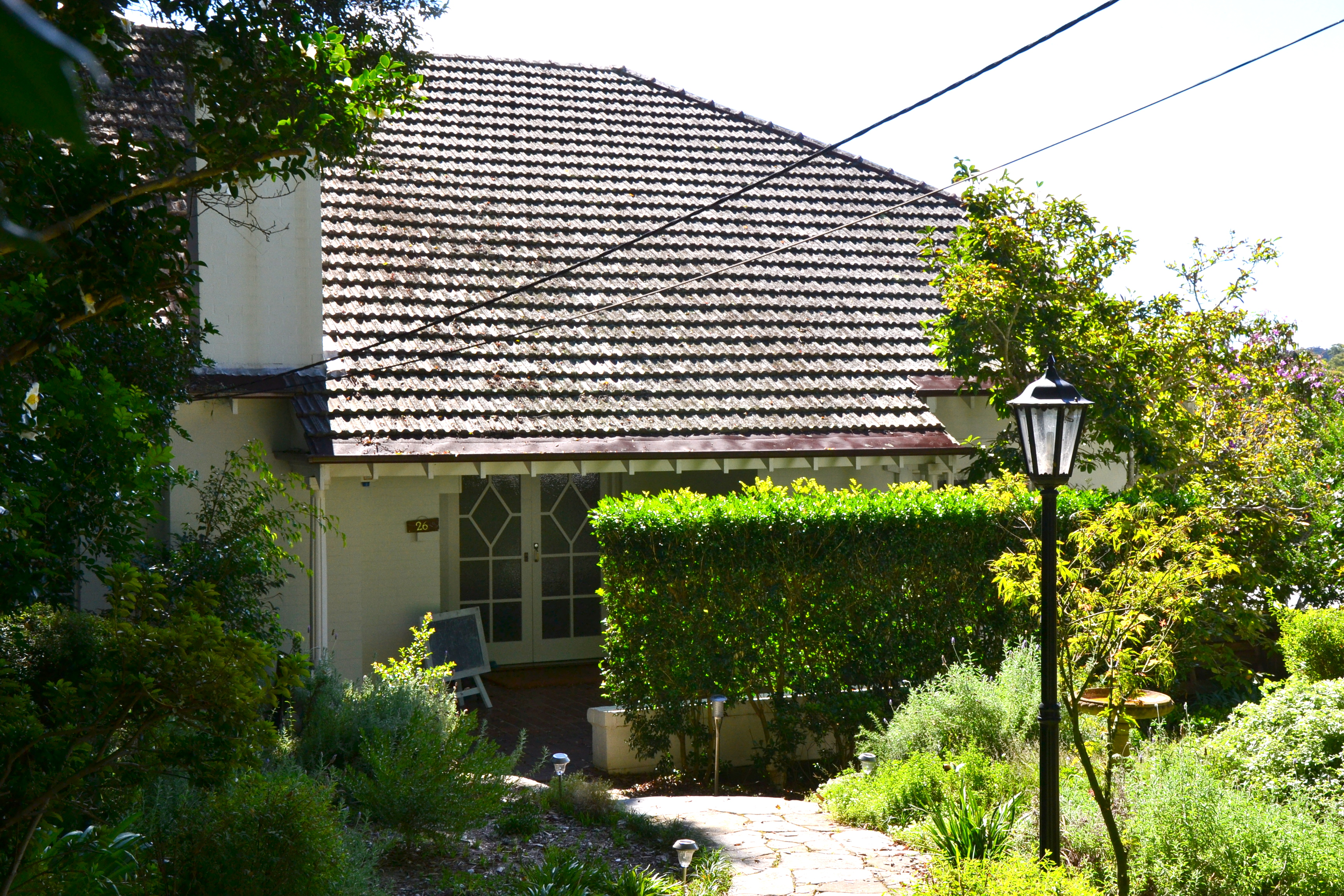
Annie Wyatt home, Gordon, New South Wales

Wyatt was born in Redfern, New South Wales in 1885, lived for much of her life in a cottage in Gordon, and died in St Ives. Annie resided with her family at 90 Cleveland Street, Redfern. She was the eldest of eight children of Isabella Anne Evans (née Forsyth) and George Trotter Evans. The growing family moved from their Redfern home in 1891 to a house named Fairholme in the semi-rural Rooty Hill area, with Annie boarding at Burwood Methodist Ladies College from the age of 10. Annie's love of Australia's bushland and history is evident in her childhood memories of Rooty Hill. Pony rides to lovely old homes such as Bungaribee, Mamre, Horsley and Graystanes featured largely in her childhood memories of wildflowers and bushlands now gone.

Annie's maternal grandfather Archibald Forsyth (1826–1908) had arrived in Australia in 1848 from Scotland. After working as a cedar-getter, a gold miner and a timber merchant he established the first rope works in New South Wales at Waterloo in 1864. His outspoken public role as a Protectionist, and a member of Parliament, and his actions as a philanthropist in setting up the Animals Protection League, and supporting the sick and hungry must have influenced his young granddaughter, who found herself speaking out about public issues in the 1920s. Believing women had a part to play, her voice was often heard asking the question "What about the women?" at various local meetings. She was an early supporter of the United Associations of Women in 1929.

== Ku-ring-gai Tree Lovers' Civic League ==
Annie first became an active advocate of conservation in 1927 when, as a mother of two small children, she set up the Ku-ring-gai Tree Lovers' Civic League. This small group, consisting mainly of women, protested against activities destroying natural areas. Campaigns against rubbish dumping in bushland, clearing newly subdivided blocks of all trees, and sale of public bushland were on the agenda. The group conducted school education programs and was asked to intervene in problems outside the local area. Balls Head Reserve was retained as a reafforested public area in 1931, and bushland at Palm Beach was retained with the help of the Ku-ring-gai Tree Lovers' Civic League. The League existed for 45 years with several branches over Australia including Orange, Hunters Hill, Darwin and Adelaide. Annie Wyatt helped to preserve a small area of Sydney's remaining bluegum and blackbutt forests as a member of the Dalrymple Hay Forest Preservation Committee in the 1930s.

== Prisoners' Aid Association of New South Wales ==
Wyatt worked for the Prisoners' Aid Association of New South Wales for twenty years, including a term as president of the women's section during 1938–1941. She regularly visited prisons, and gained the trust of notorious prisoners Tilly Devine and Kate Leigh. She advocated for the prisoners and successfully pushed for less ugly clothing, and permission to use lipstick and face powder.

== The National Trust ==
Annie's love of place saw her seeking an active role in the conservation and protection of historic buildings as well as of natural places through the creation of a body like the National Trust in England. In the 1930s, art historian Bernard Smith remembered her as quietly but consistently discussing colonial Australia with an infectious enthusiasm that attracted sympathisers to her cause. Looming large in her sense of loss of Australian heritage buildings in the 1930s and 1940s were Burdekin House and the Commissariat Stores at west Circular Quay where an apathetic public had stood back and watched these destructions.

Representing the Ku-ring-gai Tree Lovers League, Annie Wyatt finally presented to the 1944 Forestry League (NSW) Conference her case for the need to form a national trust in Australia. This was approved and on 6 April 1945 it was resolved that a national trust subcommittee of the Forestry League be formed under Walter Cresswell O'Reilly, Annie Wyatt and Arthur Cousins.

The National Trust Provisional Committee began to fulfil Annie's dream of saving Sydney's historic sites. A program of education and public campaigns against demolition and unsuitable development in historic areas followed. Annie Wyatt, in early Trust minutes, warned the group "that the last lovely Macquarie era buildings were in dire peril and that we should take our stand for their preservation". The 1946 Trust campaign to protect Macquarie Street against proposed developments was widely supported. The Trust produced an initial list of items to be preserved in 1946. The 'A' list included Sydney's Hyde Park Barracks and the Mint Building, St James' Church, Sydney, the 1815 Military Hospital at Observatory Hill, and Cadmans Cottage, which all remain today as part of Sydney's central area. The list also included items further from the centre of Sydney. Old Government House at Parramatta, John Macarthur's Elizabeth Farm House, and Lennox Bridge, as well as the cemeteries at Camperdown and Parramatta, were included on this list, and have been retained.

In 1946 the new Trust compiled an 'A' and 'B' list of Sydney's historic buildings and places and launched its first battle against proposed developments in Macquarie Street. These proposals would have seen the loss of Hyde Park Barracks and the Sydney Mint Building. Many groups supported this battle which resulted ultimately in the compilation of a combined list of significant buildings within New South Wales rated by the National Trust, Australian Institute of Architects and the Cumberland County. As a result of these efforts, buildings on the list would be protected for future generations to learn from the past.

== Heritage protection work ==
Annie Wyatt continued her role as protector of Sydney's historic buildings and places, gently reminding the early Trust committee to move beyond the discussion and basically get on with following the objectives of the Trust. As a member of both the historic buildings and conservation subcommittees of the Trust, Annie continued to work on protecting both Sydney's historic buildings and natural areas. In the minutes she warned of threats to the natural public spaces of Sydney's harbourside and to historic structures such as Lennox Bridge, St Malo at Hunters Hill and Macquarie Fields House. Until her death in 1961 Annie worked tirelessly for the National Trust of Australia (NSW) and saw the creation of similar national trusts in the other states. She continued to educate the public and protect Sydney's heritage sites until her death in 1961.

== Legacy ==
Sydney's remaining heritage buildings and places today owe much to Annie Wyatt. She was awarded an OBE in 1960. Annie Wyatt Park, a reserve at Palm Beach (33.7555°S 151.1540°E); an azalea and a stone seat in the Swain Reserve have been named in her memory. There is also an Annie Wyatt Room in the National Trust offices at The Rocks in Sydney and the Annie Forsyth Wyatt Garden at Gordon was gazetted in 1995.

== Works ==
Wyatt, A. Forsyth, (1941) Doors that slam: a romance of early Sydney, Sydney: G.M. Dash. (A copy is held in the State Library of New South Wales.)

== See also ==
- Archibald Forsyth (1826–1908) (Wyatt's maternal grandfather and Founder of the committee of the Animals Protection Society)
- Charles John Prescott (1857–1946) (Educationist, Founding Headmaster of MLC School)
- Walter Cresswell O'Reilly (1877–1954) (Mayor of Ku-ring-gai Municipal Council from 1929 until 1933)
- Tilly Devine (1900–1970) (Prisoner who regarded Wyatt as trustworthy)
- Kate Leigh (1881–1964) (Prisoner who regarded Wyatt as trustworthy)
- Minard Fannie Crommelin (1881–1972) (Conservationist)
- Edward Harold Fulcher Swain (1883–1970) (Commissioner for Forestry, appointed 1935)
