= Ian Macfarlan =

Australian politician (1881–1964)

35th Premier of Victoria
- In office 2 October 1945 – 21 November 1945
- Deputy: Thomas Maltby
- Preceded by: Albert Dunstan
- Succeeded by: John Cain (senior)

2nd Deputy Premier of Victoria
- In office 31 July 1934 – 12 March 1935
- Premier: Sir Stanley Argyle
- Preceded by: Robert Menzies
- Succeeded by: Albert Dunstan

Personal details
- Born: John Robert Macfarlan; 21 November 1881 Carlton, Melbourne, Victoria, Australia
- Died: 19 March 1964 (aged 82) Sandringham, Melbourne, Victoria, Australia
- Party: Nationalist Party (1928-1931); United Australia Party (1931-1937, 1943-1945); Independent (1937-1945); Liberal Party (1945)
- Spouse: Beryl Johnstone Wardill King

Ian Macfarlan KC (born John Robert Macfarlan; 21 November 1881 – 19 March 1964) was an Australian politician who served as the deputy leader of the Victorian Liberal Party in 1945. He was briefly commissioned as the 35th Premier of Victoria by the Governor and formed a government which brought about the end of the Dunstan ministry.

MacFarlan was the Member for Brighton from 1928 until 1945 and was Attorney-General and Solicitor-General on 3 occasions, from 26 November 1928 until 11 December 1929 in the government of William McPherson, from 25 July 1934 until 1 April 1935 in the government of Stanley Argyle and from 8 September 1943 until 20 November 1945 in the government of Albert Dunstan.

MacFarlan was a member for the Nationalist Party, which later became the United Australia Party (UAP) in 1931. He became unsatisfied with UAP's strategic inflexibility and left the UAP in 1937 to serve as an Independent Liberal. In 1943, he was persuaded to rejoin the party as deputy to party leader Thomas Hollway. The UAP became the Liberal Party of Australia in 1945.

== Early life ==
Macfarlan was born on 21 November 1881 in North Carlton, Victoria. He was the tenth child born to Scottish immigrants parents Mary (née Nairn) and James McFarlan. He was named "John Robert" but while at university adopted the Scottish Gaelic name "Ian".

Macfarlan attended the state school at Princes Hill and the Melbourne Education Institute. He joined the Victorian Railways as a clerk in 1897, but subsequently won a scholarship to attend the University of Melbourne. He resided at Ormond College and graduated Bachelor of Laws in 1907. Macfarlan served his articles of clerkship with the crown solicitor and was admitted to the Victorian Bar in 1908, following in the footsteps of his older brother James McFarlan who became a Supreme Court judge.

== Politics ==
Macfarlan was elected to the Victorian Legislative Assembly in April 1928 at a by-election for the seat of Brighton, narrowly defeating Eleanor Glencross. A member of the Nationalist Party, he was appointed Attorney-General of Victoria in November 1928 under William McPherson, serving until December 1929. He was elected deputy leader of the Nationalist Party in September 1930, but was replaced by Robert Menzies in June 1932.

In 1935, following the appointment of Country Party leader Albert Dunstan as premier, Macfarlan led a "cross-bench, country-liberal faction of the U.A.P. that advocated conditional negotiation rather than rigid opposition in dealings with Dunstan's minority government".

== Premiership ==
At the end of September 1945, the government of Albert Dunstan was defeated in the Legislative Assembly, when it voted to refuse Supply to his government. Five Liberals, two Country Party members and one Independent voted with the Labor Opposition, on the grounds of dissatisfaction with the government's legislative program and opposition to Dunstan's leadership.

Instead of resigning, however, Dunstan persuaded the Governor, Sir Winston Dugan, to grant him a dissolution of Parliament, conditional on the budget being passed. These terms drew fire from the Opposition who claimed that the Governor in his letter to the Premier had left himself open to the charge of instructing the Assembly to grant Supply to a ministry which had already been refused it and to no other.

When it became clear that the Assembly would not grant Supply to the Dunstan Ministry, the Governor commissioned Macfarlan, who was the Deputy Leader of the Liberal Party, as Premier, on the production of written assurances of support from the Labor Opposition and from members of the Liberal Party, the Country Party and the Independents whose revolt had led to Dunstan's defeat. Macfarlan formed a government, both Houses passed Votes of Supply, and the dissolution took immediate effect.

At the subsequent state election in November, the Labor Party obtained a majority (with the support of two Independents) and formed a government. The state of parties was Labor 32, United Country Party 18, Liberals 13, Independents 2. Macfarlan was one of the defeated candidates.

With a premiership lasting just 50 days, Macfarlan is the shortest serving Liberal Premier of Victoria, and is the second shortest serving Premier of Victoria behind George Elmslie (13 days).

Victorian Legislative Assembly
Preceded by Oswald Snowball	Member for Brighton; 1928–1945	Succeeded by Raymond Tovell
Political offices
Preceded by Albert Dunstan	Premier of Victoria; 1945	Succeeded by John Cain
