= Federated Association of Australian Housewives =

Australian women's organization

- Formation: 1923
- Type: Not-for-profit organisation
- Purpose: reduce the cost of living and to control 'profiteering',

The Federated Association of Australian Housewives was formed in 1923 to control the cost of living and reduce 'profiteering'. It held its first national conference in 1926. In the 1940s it was the largest women's group in Australia. Accusations of collaboration with a margerine company led to expulsions and a successful court case for defamation.

== History ==
The idea for an organisation to represent housewives began in the state of Victoria in 1915. Three years later, a sister organisation was formed in New South Wales. During the 1920s this national organisation was formed together with groups in South Australian led by Agnes Goode and another in Western Australia. Tasmania formed their group in 1934, and Canberra and Queensland created their groups in the 1930s. By 1940 or 1941 the Federated Association of Australian Housewives was the largest women's group in Australia with 115,000 members.

In 1941 there was a disagreement. Ex President Portia Geach and four others were expelled from the organisation by Eleanor Glencross who was the chair of the directors. They had accused the organisation of collaborating with the Meadow-Lea Margarine Company. Margaret Simson, who had been expelled. took the case to court accusing Eleanor Glencross of defamation and she won the case. Glencross was bankrupted by the settlement although she continued to lead the association.

In 1946 the "New Housewives Association" was formed by Jean Edna Blackburn. In 1947 Geach and others formed the Progressive Housewives Association, New South Wales as a similar women's rights organisation representing homemakers.

During the 60s the membership grew to 175,000. In the 70s and 80s more women had careers and joined the workforce. The reduced number of housewives led to falling membership and the branch in Victoria closed in 1991.

== Presidents include ==
- Eleanor Glencross
- Portia Geach
- Cecilia Downing 1940-1946
- Gladys Adeline Hain c.1950s
- Phyllis Benjamin 1951–53, 1967–68, 1976–78
