= Alan Stockdale =

Australian politician

The Honourable Alan Stockdale AO
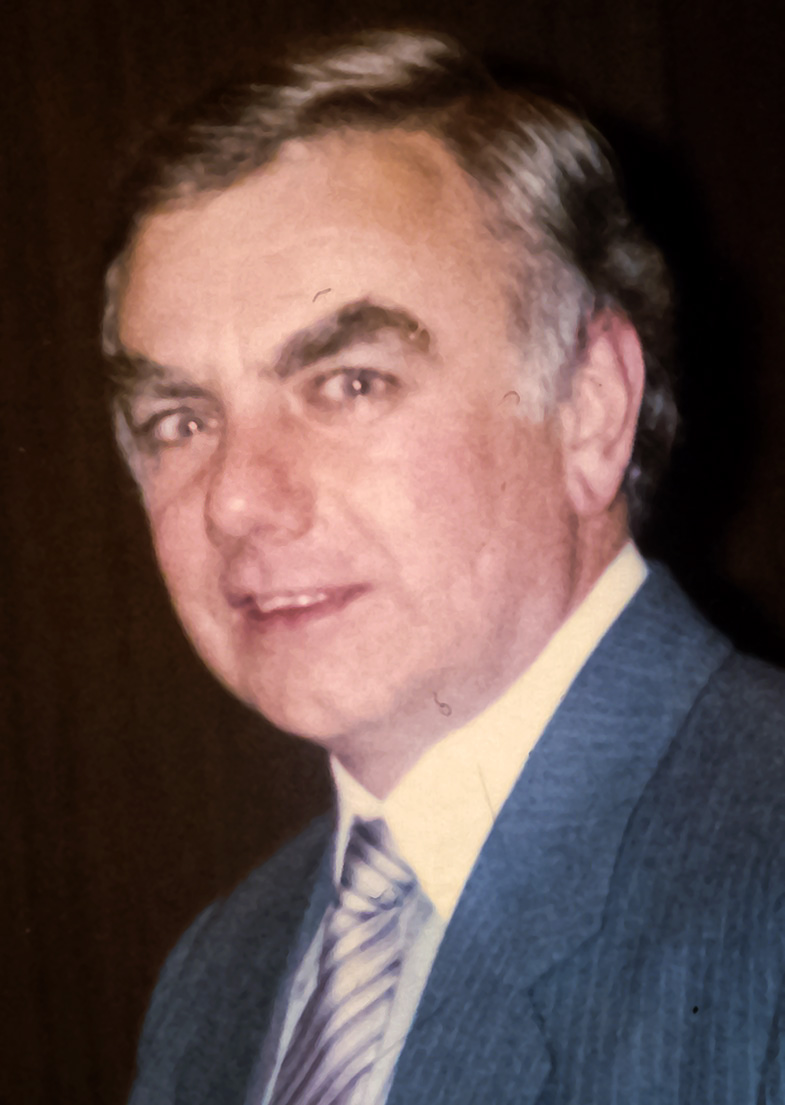
- Stockdale as Member for Brighton

President of the Liberal Party of Australia
- In office 19 February 2008 – 25 June 2014
- Leader: Brendan Nelson; Malcolm Turnbull; Tony Abbott
- Preceded by: Chris McDiven
- Succeeded by: Richard Alston

Treasurer of Victoria
- In office 6 October 1992 – 7 October 1999
- Premier: Jeff Kennett
- Preceded by: Tony Sheehan
- Succeeded by: Denis Napthine

Member of the Victorian Parliament for Brighton
- In office 2 March 1985 – 17 September 1999
- Preceded by: Jeannette Patrick
- Succeeded by: Louise Asher

Personal details
- Born: Alan Robert Stockdale; 21 April 1945 (age 81) Melbourne, Victoria, Australia
- Citizenship: Australian
- Party: Liberal Party of Australia
- Spouse(s): Deirdre O'Shea (?); Doreen Kiely; Dominique Fisher (2003–)
- Education: University of Melbourne
- Profession: Lawyer

Alan Robert Stockdale AO (born 21 April 1945) is an Australian former politician who was the President of the Liberal Party of Australia from 2008 to 2014 and a former deputy leader of the Victorian Liberal Party. He represented the seat of Brighton in the Victorian Legislative Assembly from 1985 to 1999, and served as the Treasurer of Victoria in the government of Jeff Kennett from 1992 to 1999.

== Early life ==
After attending Melbourne High School during his secondary years, Stockdale undertook his tertiary education at the University of Melbourne, obtaining his LL.B. in 1967, followed by his B.A. in 1970. While at University, he was active within the Melbourne University Liberal Club, becoming president in 1965. He also chaired both the Melbourne University Debating Union and Melbourne University Debating Society, representing the University at inter-varsity debates in 1966.

== Legal career ==
Upon completion of his tertiary education, Stockdale pursued a legal career as a self-employed barrister, specialising in industrial relations. In 1977, he was admitted to practice as a barrister and solicitor of the Supreme Court of Victoria, followed by the Supreme Court of New South Wales in 1982. Stockdale also signed the High Court Roll of Practitioners in 1977.

== Political life ==
On 2 March 1985, Stockdale was elected to the Victorian Legislative Assembly as the Member for Brighton, a very safe seat for the Liberal Party. Stockdale served on various parliamentary committees in opposition. In 1989, he unsuccessfully contested the leadership of the State Liberal Party after the resignation of Jeff Kennett.

When a reinstated Jeff Kennett led the Liberal Party to victory at the 1992, Stockdale became Treasurer. As treasurer he led the privatisation program of the government, and established the Electricity Supply Industry Reform Unit to manage the privatisation of the electricity sector. Stockdale is also credited with being the world's first Minister for Multimedia, which portfolio was added the additional responsibility of Information Technology in 1998.

== Post-political career ==
Upon retiring from state parliament in 1999, Stockdale accepted a position within Macquarie Bank, as Executive Chairman, Asset & Infrastructure Group, as well as the chairmanship of Axon Instruments Inc. He was also appointed as chairman of Symex Holdings Ltd and as a director of the Melbourne Football Club from 1999 to 2001. He became a partner in Mills Oakley Lawyers in 2005.

Stockdale was Federal President of the Liberal Party from February 2008 until June 2014. In 2025, new federal Liberal Leader, Sussan Ley ousted Stockdale from the administrative panel managing the affairs of NSW Liberal branch, following some controversial comments he made about women in the Liberal Party

== Personal life ==
Stockdale has been married three times. After a brief marriage to Deirdre O'Shea, he married Doreen Kiely in the 1970s. They were together until the late 1990s, and three sons. In 2003, Stockdale married Dominique Fisher, who was married to Peter Collins who was Treasurer of New South Wales between 1993 and 1995, during the time that Stockdale was Treasurer of Victoria.

Victorian Legislative Assembly
Preceded by Jeannette Patrick	Member for Brighton; 1985–1999	Succeeded by Louise Asher
Political offices
Preceded by Tony Sheehan	Treasurer of Victoria; 1992–1999	Succeeded by Denis Napthine
Party political offices
Preceded by Chris McDiven	President of the Liberal Party of Australia; 2008–2014	Succeeded by Richard Alston
