= Ray Tovell =

Australian politician

Ray Tovell CBE, DSO & Bar, ED

Member of the Victorian Legislative Assembly for Brighton
- In office 10 November 1945 – 27 May 1955
- Preceded by: Ian Macfarlan
- Succeeded by: John Rossiter

Personal details
- Born: 9 March 1890 Brighton, Victoria
- Died: 18 June 1966 (aged 76) Brighton, Victoria
- Party: Liberal and Country Party (1945–53); Electoral Reform League (1953–55)

Military service
- Allegiance: Australia
- Branch/service: Australian Imperial Force; Citizen Military Forces
- Years of service: 1915–1919; 1921–1945
- Rank: Brigadier
- Commands: 26th Brigade (1940–42); 10th Brigade (1939–40); 46th Battalion (1932–38); 14th Battalion (1924–29)
- Battles/wars: First World War; Battle of Pozières; Battle of Hamel; Second World War; North African campaign; First Battle of El Alamein
- Awards: Commander of the Order of the British Empire; Distinguished Service Order & Bar; Efficiency Decoration; Mentioned in Despatches (5)

Brigadier Raymond Walter Tovell, CBE, DSO & Bar, ED (9 March 1890 – 18 June 1966) was an Australian soldier and politician.

== Military career ==
Tovell was born in Brighton, Victoria, the fourth child of Victorian-born parents Charles Edward Tovell, solicitor, and his wife Mary Annie (née Mitchell). He attended Brighton Grammar School and qualified as an accountant in 1911. During the First World War, he served with the 4th Brigade, attaining the rank of major and being awarded the Distinguished Service Order (DSO). After his return, he was a member of the Tovell and Lucas accountancy firm, but remained in the military, as commanding officer of the 14th Battalion (Prahran Regiment) from 1924 to 30 June 1929, and the 46th Battalion (Brighton Rifles) from 1932 to 1938.

Tovell served on Brighton City Council from 1924 to 1926. On 10 June 1924, he married Madelaine Eliza Dubrelle Guthrie, with whom he had two daughters. He was on the army staff at headquarters from 1938 to 1939, when he returned to active duty as a brigadier and commander of the 10th and 26th brigades, serving at Tobruk, El Alamein and in New Guinea. He was mentioned in despatches thrice (making five times in total), one of them in June 1942, and again in December that year, awarded a Bar to the DSO in 1942, and appointed a Commander of the Order of the British Empire in early 1943. From 1944 to 1945 he was deputy adjutant-general at Land Headquarters, and he was awarded the Efficiency Decoration.

== Political career ==
In 1945, Tovell was elected to the Victorian Legislative Assembly as the Liberal member for Brighton, and from 1948 to 1950 he was Minister of Public Instruction. A supporter of Thomas Hollway, he was Minister of Education and Electrical Undertakings during Hollway's seventy-hour ministry in 1952 and was consequently expelled from the Liberal and Country Party. As an Electoral Reform Party candidate, he retained his seat at the 1952 state election, but was defeated at the 1955 election, when standing for the Victorian Liberal Party. Tovell died at Brighton in 1966.

Victorian Legislative Assembly
Preceded by Ian Macfarlan	Member for Brighton; 1945–1955	Succeeded by John Rossiter
