= John Rossiter =

Australian politician

Sir John Frederick Rossiter KBE (17 December 1913 – 18 January 1988) was an Australian politician.

Born in Melbourne to public servant James Alexander Rossiter and Sarah (née Nicholas) Rossiter, he attended Middle Park State School, Melbourne High School and the University of Melbourne, studying for his Bachelor of Arts. He then went to Melbourne Teachers' College and taught from 1937 to 1940 before enlisting in the Royal Australian Air Force, in which he served from 1940 to 1946.

On 1 March 1939 he married Joan Stewart, with whom he had three children. From 1946 to 1955 he was a senior lecturer in English at the Royal Melbourne Institute of Technology. A member of the Liberal Party, he contested a by-election in Brunswick in 1949, and then was elected to the Victorian Legislative Assembly in 1955 as the member for Brighton. He served as Assistant Minister for Education (1964–1970), Minister for Immigration (1965–1967), Minister for Labour and Industry (1967–1970), Minister for Health (1970–1973) and Chief Secretary (1973–1976) before his retirement in 1976. From 1976 to 1979 he served in London as Agent-General for Victoria. Rossiter was made a Knight Commander of the Order of the British Empire in 1978. His wife died in 1979. In 1980 Rossiter moved to Sydney and on 7 November 1980 he married Heather Steer. Rossiter died in 1988.

Lady Susan Renouf was one of his three children.

Parliament of Victoria
Preceded by Raymond Tovell	Member for Brighton; 1955–1976	Succeeded by Jeannette Patrick
