= Jeannette Patrick =

Australian politician

Jeannette Tweeddale Patrick (née Breen; 2 November 1929 – 24 May 2011) was an Australian politician. She was a Liberal Party member of the Victorian Legislative Assembly from 1976 to 1985.

Patrick was born in Brighton, the daughter of solicitor Robert Breen and future Senator Dame Marie Breen. She studied at Firbank Girls' Grammar School, and after short stints as a kindergarten teacher and dental nurse, undertook the article clerks' course at Melbourne University, and was admitted as a barrister and solicitor of the Supreme Court of Victoria on 3 April 1967. She worked as a solicitor in her family firm of R. T. Breen & Company from that point on. She was a City of Brighton councillor from 1973 to 1976, a member of the Consumer Affairs Council from 1974 to 1975, and was honorary solicitor to a number of local organisations.

Patrick was elected to the Legislative Assembly at the 1976 state election, having defeated Peter Reith and Alan Dixon, among others, for preselection in the safe Liberal seat. Only the fifth woman to enter the Legislative Assembly, and the only one serving for her first eighteen months, she entered a parliament where there was no female toilets in the legislative wing.

In 1977, she was involved in the research, drafting and passage of the Equal Opportunity Act, which she would later tout as her greatest accomplishment in parliament. She was a member of the Public Accounts Committee in her first term and was promoted to secretary to the parliamentary Liberal party in 1979, the first Liberal woman to hold such a position. In 1980, she chaired a government inquiry into the possibility of abortion law reform in Victoria. The Liberal Party lost the 1982 election; afterwards she was promoted to Shadow Minister for Consumer Affairs and Shadow Minister for Local Government.

Her husband was diagnosed with lung cancer in 1984, and she retired at the 1985 state election.

Patrick died in Brighton on 24 May 2011 following a series of strokes. Her daughter, Jane Patrick, has been a judge of the County Court of Victoria since 2008.

Parliament of Victoria
Preceded by John Rossiter	Member for Brighton; 1976–1985	Succeeded by Alan Stockdale
