= Oswald Snowball =

Australian politician (1859–1928)

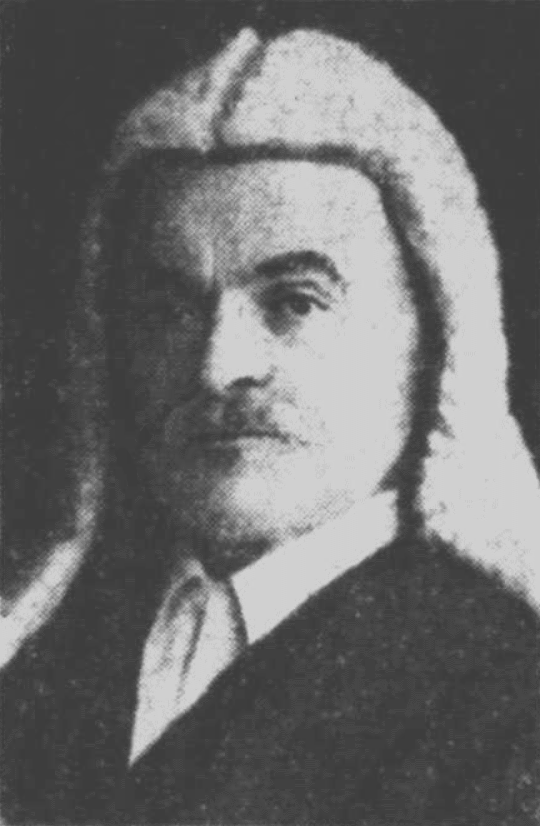

14th Speaker of the Victorian Legislative Assembly
- In office 6 July 1927 – 16 March 1928
- Preceded by: Sir John Bowser
- Succeeded by: Sir Alexander Peacock

Member of the Victorian Legislative Assembly for Brighton
- In office 8 October 1909 – 16 March 1928
- Preceded by: Sir Thomas Bent
- Succeeded by: Ian Macfarlan

Personal details
- Born: Oswald Robinson Snowball; 18 July 1859 Wolsingham, County Durham, England, United Kingdom
- Died: 16 March 1928 (aged 68) East Melbourne, Victoria, Australia
- Resting place: Brighton Cemetery
- Party: Nationalist
- Other political affiliations: Commonwealth Liberal Party
- Spouse: Ellen Grace Anketell
- Education: University of Melbourne
- Profession: Solicitor

Oswald Robinson Snowball (18 July 1859 – 16 March 1928) was an English-born Australian politician.

Snowball was born in Wolsingham, England, and arrived in Australia in 1868 where his family spent three years on the land. He studied at Carlton College and the University of Melbourne where he qualified as a solicitor and was admitted to practice in 1883. He was a partner in the firms Briggs & Snowball and later Snowball & Kaufmann.

Snowball was elected to the Victorian parliament representing the Commonwealth Liberal Party in the seat of Brighton in a by-election on 8 October 1909. He was a prominent advocate of divorce law reform, in which he was supported by Rev. William Bottomley and the Melbourne Unitarian Church. He served on various royal commissions, until he was voted Speaker of the Victorian Legislative Assembly at the commencement of the 29th Parliament on 6 July 1927. Snowball died in office on 16 March the next year.

Victorian Legislative Assembly
Preceded by Sir Thomas Bent	Member for Brighton; 1909–1928	Succeeded by Ian Macfarlan
Preceded by Sir John Bowser	Speaker of the Victorian Legislative Assembly; 1927–1928	Succeeded by Sir Alexander Peacock
