= Thomas Bent =

Australian politician (1838–1909)

The Honourable Sir Thomas Bent KCMG
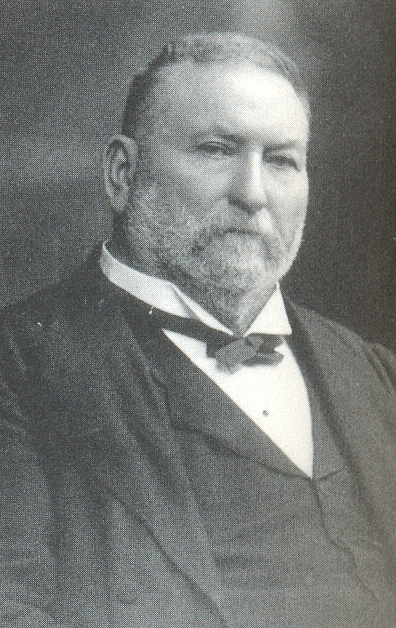
- Bent c. 1900s
- Born: 7 December 1838; Penrith, New South Wales
- Died: 17 September 1909 (aged 70); Brighton, Victoria
- Resting place: Brighton General Cemetery
- Other name: Sobriquet: "Honest Tom Bent"
- Occupations: Land speculator; developer; politician
- Spouses: Hannah Hall; Elizabeth Huntly
- Children: 2
- Father: James Bent

22nd Premier of Victoria
- In office 16 February 1904 – 8 January 1909
- Preceded by: William Irvine
- Succeeded by: John Murray

6th Speaker of the Victorian Legislative Assembly
- In office 11 May 1892 – September 1894
- Preceded by: Matthew Davies
- Succeeded by: Graham Berry

Member of the Victorian Legislative Assembly for Brighton
- In office 1 November 1900 – 17 September 1909
- Preceded by: William Moule
- Succeeded by: Oswald Snowball
- In office 16 March 1871 – 4 September 1894
- Preceded by: George Higinbotham
- Succeeded by: William Moule

Sir Thomas Bent KCMG (7 December 1838 – 17 September 1909) was an Australian politician who served as the 22nd Premier of Victoria.

As a land speculator and property developer, Bent used his political power for personal profit, having served on the local councils for Brighton and Moorabbin for approximately 45 years. Bent was associated with many scandals, particularly in government land deals, the duplication of Brighton's railway, and the re-routing of the tramline from St Kilda to be located adjacent to properties where he held a financial interest.

In 1892, a select committee of the Victorian Parliament and, in 1909, a royal commission dealt with charges of corruption against Bent. He was cleared of any financial gain, however, it censured him strongly for unconstitutional behaviour, cast suspicion on many of his dealings, and did not entirely clear him of all the allegations.

Consequently, during his political career, Bent was known by his sobriquet, "Honest Tom Bent". A biography, published in 1993, was titled Tommy Bent: Bent by Name, Bent by Nature.

== Early life ==
Bent was born in Penrith, New South Wales the eldest of four sons and two daughters of James Bent, a former convict and hotelkeeper. He came to Melbourne with his parents in 1849, was educated in Fitzroy, and commenced working a market gardener in Brighton East.

In 1861 he became a rate collector for the town council of Brighton, at the time a fast-growing suburb. He soon began buying and selling land as a property developer in the areas surrounding Brighton and Moorabbin. He developed a major new subdivision, later named Bentleigh, in his honour. He was a member of both Brighton and Moorabbin town councils, and was Mayor of Brighton nine times.

== State politics ==
In 1871 Bent was elected to the Victorian Legislative Assembly for the district of Brighton, defeating the veteran liberal George Higinbotham "to the amazement of everyone". He had no particular party loyalties and first held office in the Service government in 1880. He was Commissioner for Works and Railways in the ministry of Sir Bryan O'Loghlen in 1881–1883, and used this position to extend the railway line from Caulfield to Cheltenham, thus enormously increasing the value of his own property developments. The exposure of Bent's dealings led to the defeat of the O'Loghlen government at the 1883 elections, which led to the Melbourne Punch publishing a satirical lament.

Bent spent eighteen years on the backbench and concentrated on his property dealings. His fortunes suffered a reversal in 1888 when a bad investment in Ringwood caused the collapse of the Thomas Bent Land Co., but he soon recovered and became a leading player in the great Melbourne land boom that reached its climax in 1890. For instance, in 1884 Bent purchased property in Exhibition Street for £1,488 and on the same day resold it for £2,000. In 1892 he surprised his critics by being elected Speaker as part of a complex political deal. A newspaper asked: "Why is Speaker Bent the first commoner in the land? Because no-one commoner than Bent can be found."

In the severe crash that followed the boom Bent was almost bankrupted, with debts of £80,000. He had transferred many of his assets to his wife's name and this saved him from bankruptcy. At the election which followed the fall of James Patterson's government, Bent was defeated at Brighton. His fate was sealed when The Age published letters Bent had written as Railways Minister in 1881, offering MPs railways lines in their electorates in exchange for their votes.

Bent moved with his wife Elizabeth and their two daughters to Port Fairy, where he took up dairy farming. Not intent of leaving politics, in 1897 he unsuccessfully stood for the Electoral district of Port Fairy, and moved back to Melbourne in 1900. At the elections held later that year, Bent regained his former seat in the Assembly as the Member for Brighton and in the conservative ministry of William Irvine, he was re-appointed as Minister for Railways. He again purchased land in Brighton and then approved a tramline from St Kilda to Brighton that was located adjacent to his property investments.

A fellow alderman on the Brighton Council successfully sued Bent for slander in the Supreme Court in 1896; and the jury awarded a penalty of £15, plus costs. Despite his reputation, Bent was chosen as the new Liberal leader in Victoria when Irvine quit to go into federal politics in 1904, and thus became premier at the age of 66. By this time Bent had grown very fat and his jovial manner, together with Victoria's gradual recovery from the 1890s depression, gained him renewed popularity. At the June 1904 elections he won a comfortable majority, and did so again in 1907. His government favoured more state intervention in the economy than had 19th-century liberal governments, and there was now agreement on the need for high tariffs to protect Victorian industry. His greatest boast was that he restored stability and prosperity to Victoria.

During 1908, however, Bent's government began to disintegrate as a result of conflict between country and city interests. A bloc of country members led by John Murray opposed Bent's Land Valuation Bill, and to appease them Bent withdrew the bill and appointed several of Murray's supporters to the ministry. But this antagonised Melbourne Liberals led by William Watt, and in January 1909 the various dissidents united to defeat Bent in the Assembly. Bent resigned and Murray became premier.

Bent was appointed a Knight Commander of the Order of St Michael and St George (KCMG) in 1908.

== Death and legacy ==
Sir Thomas Bent Statue
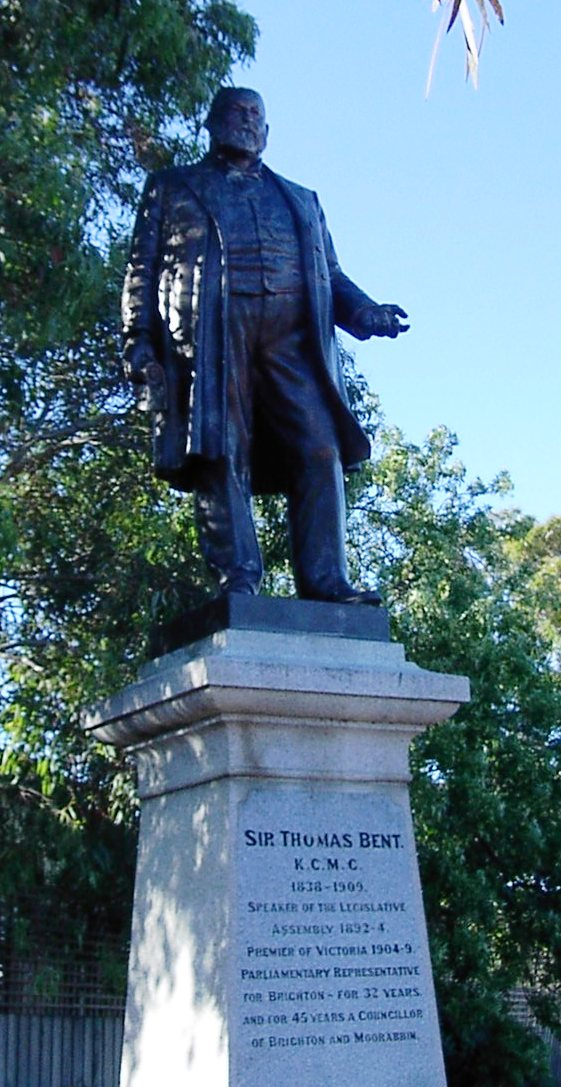
- The statue of Bent, in 2004
- Interactive map of Sir Thomas Bent Statue
- 37°54′22″S 145°00′28″E
- Type: Bronze sculpture (memorial statue and fountain)
- Location: Nepean Highway, Brighton, Melbourne

History
- Dedicated: 27 October 1913
- Founder: Brighton Town Council
- Built: 1913; 113 years ago
- Built by: C. W. Marriott (metalworker)
- Rebuilt: 1980 (relocated)

Site notes
- Material: Bronze; granite
- Height: 2.9 m (9 ft 6 in)
- Sculptor: Margaret Baskerville
- Owner: City of Bayside

Victorian Heritage Register
- Official name: Sir Thomas Bent Statue
- Type: Registered place
- Designated: 13 February 2003
- Reference no.: H2023
- Heritage overlay no.: HO257
- Category: Monuments and Memorials

Register of the National Estate
- Official name: Sir Thomas Bent Statue
- Type: Defunct register
- Designated: undated
- Reference no.: 103906

Bent died on 17 September 1909 from complications associated with diabetes at his home in Bay Street, Brighton. He was given a state funeral, attended by approximately 15,000 people, and buried in Brighton Cemetery.

He was married twice, to Hannah Hall, who died childless, and to Elizabeth Huntley. His estate was valued at £35,000 (equivalent to $5,600,000 in 2022), most of it going to his daughters from his second marriage. A daughter, Elizabeth Bleazby, was one of the first female municipal councillors in Victoria.

His counsel, when before the 1909 royal commission, described Bent thus:

"He is quick, alert, forceful, progressive, and with a contempt for details, like all great men. He is a born captain of industry. He likes big undertakings.. He has a disregard for red tape formalities, purely official restraints, and when he decides that a thing ought to be done, he gives no peace to anybody till it is done. Perhaps that is the reason why he is not persona grata with some public officials with whom he has come in contact. He likes to get to the heart of his work, and carry it through, and do things. The man who will undertake progressive developments in the interests of the State, who will carry out big undertakings, must sometimes make mistakes. The man who never makes mistakes will never do anything. These facts must be considered when discussing the various matters that come before you. In other words, Sir Thomas is more of a Napoleon than a Chesterfield. He does not study deportment or dignity. He does not allow himself to be carried away by too much politeness. If anything, lie is rather brusque. He is a straight, outspoken "John Bull." You know what he means. He is not one of those diplomatic, cultured artists whom we read of and meet occasionally, men who can conceal their thoughts in seven or eight languages. He speaks plain Saxon, and that is why the erroneous impression has got abroad that he would, perhaps, not altogether allow his Ministers to completely dictate to him."

— William H. Croker, 7 July 1909; published in the Melbourne Punch on 23 September 1909, following Bent's death and state funeral.

A large portrait of Bent, commissioned by a group of Brighton residents, was painted by Charles E. Gordon-Frazer in 1892, whilst Bent was Speaker, and was hung in the Brighton Town Hall, as part of the Bayside Council art collection.

=== Statue ===
A few years after his death, the Brighton Council raised money by public subscription to commemorate the memory of its most famous politician. The 2.9-metre-high (10 ft) bronze statue of Bent, designed by the sculptor Margaret Baskerville and cast by C. W. Marriott, was unveiled in 1913, located on the Nepean Highway in Brighton. The sculpture was added to the Victorian Heritage Register on 13 February 2003 in recognition of its historical and social significance; and was also added to non-statutory lists by the Victorian branch of the National Trust on 14 December 1994 and the now defunct Register of the National Estate on an unknown date.

It was unusual that such an important public commission was given to a woman sculptor in Melbourne in the 1910s. This work helped Baskerville establish her reputation as Victoria's first professional female sculptor and resulted in her gaining further public commissions in later years. The statue is mounted on a tall granite plinth and a memorial drinking fountain, dedicated to Bent's second wife, is situated adjacent to the statue. The granite memorial has four piers supporting a canopy embellished with a cusped arch. A bronze medallion held by two cherubs depicts, in low-relief, a bust of Elizabeth Bent.

Dubbed as the "Tommy Bent's statue", for many years it was a well-known Melbourne landmark, which, at the time of the Victorian Football League grand final, was decorated with a cap and scarf in the colours of the team that won the premiership. In the late 1960s, the statue was regularly defaced by a bucket of usually white paint—perhaps as a New Year's Eve prank. As a result of the widening of the Nepean Highway in 1980, the statue and fountain were moved to a less prominent location near Bay Street and its landmark status was lost.

== Gallery ==
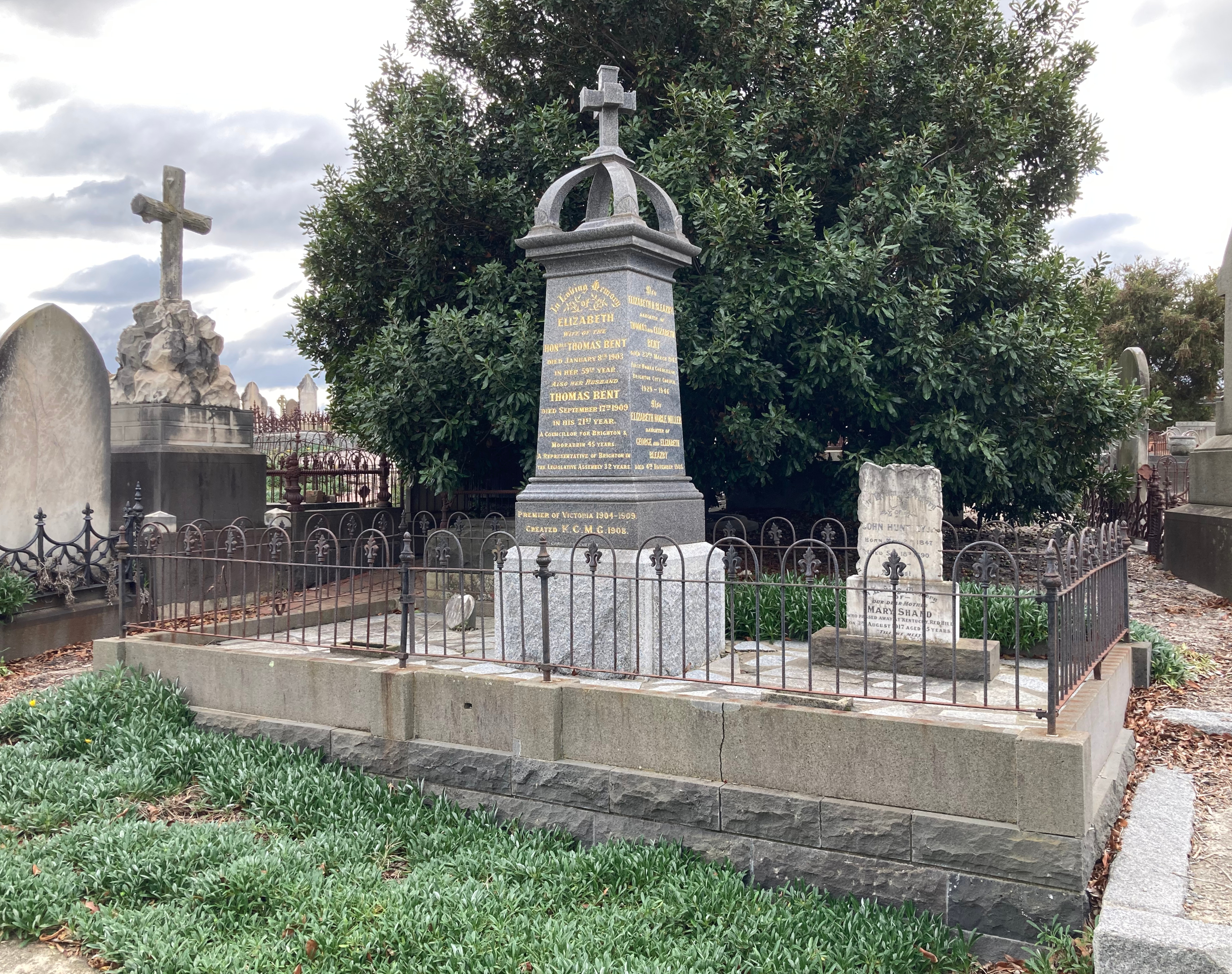
The Bent family grave at Brighton General Cemetery

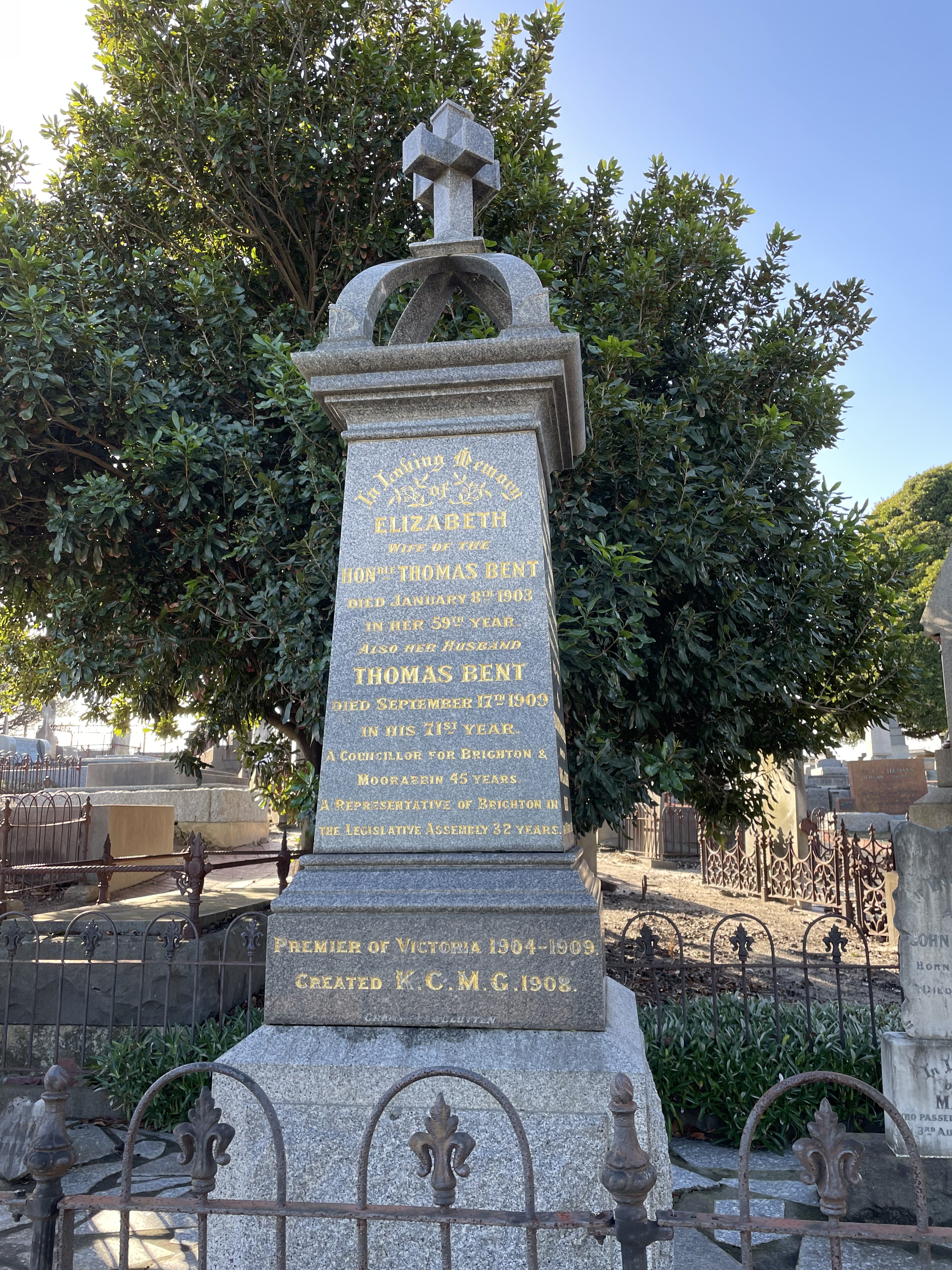
Inscription on Bent's grave

== See also ==
- List of Premiers of Victoria
- List of places on the Victorian Heritage Register in the City of Frankston

Political offices
Preceded by William Irvine	Premier of Victoria; 1904–1909	Succeeded by John Murray
Victorian Legislative Assembly
Preceded by Matthew Davies	Speaker of the Victorian Legislative Assembly; 1892–1894	Succeeded by Graham Berry
Preceded by George Higinbotham	Member for Brighton; 1871–1894	Succeeded by William Moule
Preceded by William Moule	Member for Brighton; 1900–1909	Succeeded by Oswald Snowball
