= Eleanor Glencross =

Australian feminist (1876–1950)

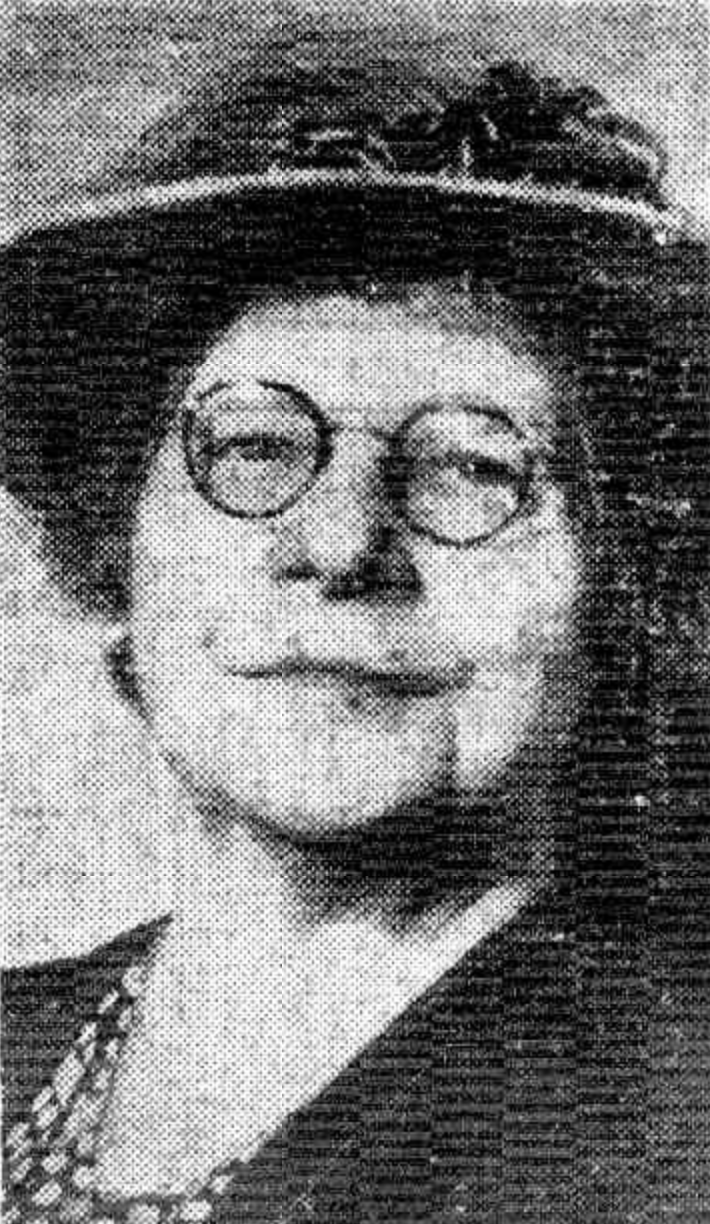
- Eleanor Glencross, c.1950
- Born: Eleanor Cameron; 11 November 1876; Sydney, Australia
- Died: 2 May 1950 (aged 73); Cremorne, Sydney
- Occupations: feminist, housewives' advocate
- Years active: 1911–1950
- Known for: Chairwoman, Housewives' Association of New South Wales

Eleanor Glencross (11 November 1876 – 2 May 1950) was an Australian feminist and housewives' advocate. She led the Housewives' Association of New South Wales and she was the first chair of the Federated Association of Australian Housewives. She expelled members from the association and she was bankrupted by a successful defamation suit that followed. Canberra named a street after her.

== Life ==
Glencross was born Eleanor Cameron in Sydney to unionist and politician Angus Cameron and Eleanor, née Lyons. She attended Cleveland Street Public School and Mis Somerville's Ladies' College and worked for the Liberal and Reform Association. She became general secretary and organiser of the Australian Women's National League in 1911 before returning to Sydney in 1913 to work for the Liberal Association of New South Wales. On 14 March 1917 she married Andrew William Glencross at St Stephen's Presbyterian Church, moving to Stawell later that year and vigorously supporting the pro-conscription campaign.

Glencross was appointed honorary director of the prohibitionist Strength of Empire Movement in 1918, and worked for various temperance organisations. She became president of the Housewives' Association of Victoria in 1920 and the founding president of the Federated Association of Australian Housewives in 1923, working for a lower cost of living. From 1927 to 1928 she was president of the National Council of Women of Victoria, having assisted in the formation of the Victorian Women Citizens' Movement in 1922. She unsuccessfully ran for public office three times as an independent candidate: for Henty federally in 1922, Brighton at a state by-election in 1928, and Martin federally in 1943. In 1927 she was one of the first female justices of the peace in Victoria.

Women's organisations demanded that a woman should be part of the Commonwealth Film Censorship Board and Glencross was chosen. She moved to Sydney in 1928 after her appointment. However the Scullin government appointed Gwendoline Dorothea Julie Hansen in 1929. Glencross made accusations of political bias but an investigation by Frank Forde found her claims to have no foundation.

Glencross presided over the Good Film and Radio Vigilance League of New South Wales but was left financially insecure by her husband's death in 1930. In 1931 she worked for the National Association of New South Wales and the United Australia Party, and in 1938 was given a salary as chairwoman of the directors of the Housewives' Association of New South Wales, clashing frequently with Portia Geach. Geach and others were expelled from the association which led Geach to form the rival Progressive Housewives Association, New South Wales in 1947.

Despite allegations of dictatorship, Glencross continued public life during World War II, serving on the state advisory committee of the Commonwealth Prices Commissioner, the council of the Lord Mayor's Patriotic War Fund and the executive of the Women's Voluntary National Register. Bankrupted by a 1946 defamation suit brought by Margaret Simson whom she had expelled, she continued to lead the housewives association. Glencross died at Cremorne in 1950 and was buried in the Presbyterian section of Rookwood Cemetery.

In 1978 a street in the Canberra suburb of Chisholm was named Glencross Street in her honour, recognising her work as a social reformer.
