= Electoral district of Brighton =

State electoral district of Victoria, Australia

Brighton Victoria—Legislative Assembly
- Interactive map of electoral district boundaries from the 2022 state election
- State: Victoria
- Created: 1856
- MP: James Newbury
- Party: Liberal
- Namesake: Suburb of Brighton
- Electors: 45,224 (2018)
- Area: 20 km^{2} (7.7 sq mi)
- Demographic: Metropolitan
- Coordinates: 37.90°S 145°E

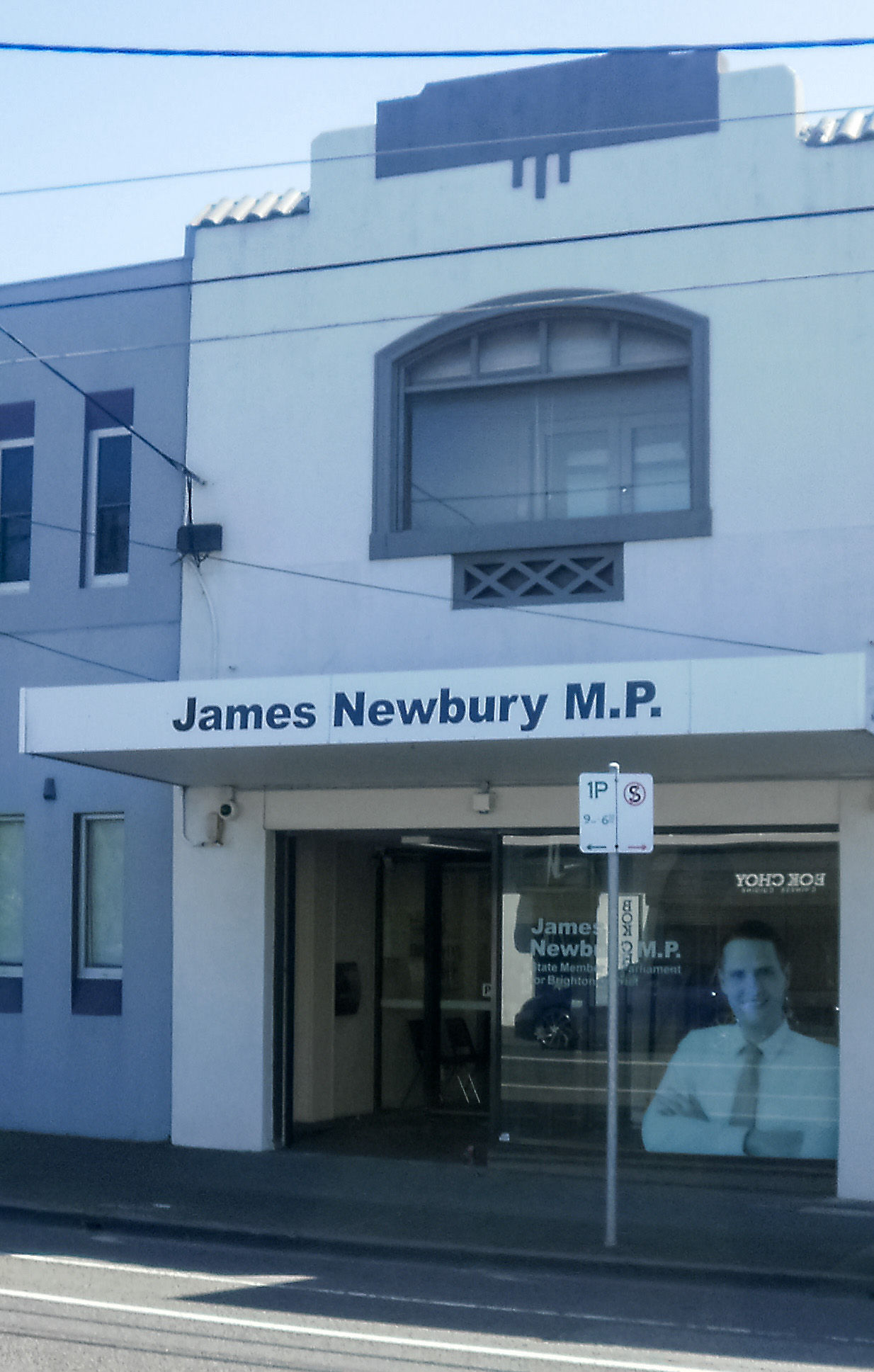
Electoral Office of Current Member for Brighton James Newbury

The electoral district of Brighton is an electoral district of the Victorian Legislative Assembly. It covers an area of 20 square kilometres (7.7 sq mi) in south-eastern Melbourne, including the suburbs of Brighton and Elwood, and parts of Brighton East and Hampton. It lies within the Southern Metropolitan Region of the upper house, the Legislative Council.

It is one of only three electorates (along with Richmond and Williamstown) to have existed continuously since 1856. Brighton was defined in the Victoria Constitution Act, 1855, as: "Commencing on the Sea Coast at the South-west Angle of Section 25, Parish of Moorabbin, thence by a Line East to the South-east Angle of Section 55; on the East by a Line bearing North, being the Parish Boundary from the said Point to the North-east Angle of Section 63; on the North by the Road bearing West to the Sea Coast, and on the West by the Sea Coast to the commencing Point."

== Members for Brighton ==
Member	Party	Term
Jonathan Binns Were	Unaligned	1856–1857
Charles Ebden	Unaligned	1857–1861
George Higinbotham	Unaligned	1861-1861
William Brodribb	Unaligned	1861–1862
George Higinbotham	Unaligned	1862–1871
Sir Thomas Bent	Unaligned	1871–1894
William Moule	Unaligned	1894–1900
Sir Thomas Bent	Unaligned	1900–1909
Oswald Snowball	Liberal	1909–1917
Oswald Snowball	Nationalist	1917–1924
Oswald Snowball	Australian Liberal	1924–1927
Oswald Snowball	Independent Nationalist	1927–1928
Ian Macfarlan	Nationalist	1928–1931
Ian Macfarlan	United Australia	1931–1937
Ian Macfarlan	Independent	1937–1943
Ian Macfarlan	United Australia	1943–1945
Ian Macfarlan	Liberal	1945
Ray Tovell	Liberal	1945–1955
Ray Tovell	Electoral Reform League	1945–1955
Sir John Rossiter	Liberal	1955–1976
Jeannette Patrick	Liberal	1976–1985
Alan Stockdale	Liberal	1985–1999
Louise Asher	Liberal	1999–2018
James Newbury	Liberal	2018–present

== Election results ==
2022 Victorian state election: Brighton
Party	Candidate	Votes	%	±%
Liberal	James Newbury	18,791	45.6	+0.8
Labor	Louise Crawford	10,164	24.7	−7.4
Greens	Sarah Dekiere	5,680	13.8	−1.1
Independent	Felicity Frederico	3,749	9.1	+9.1
Independent	Sally Gibson	941	2.3	+2.3
Animal Justice	Alicia Walker	851	2.1	−2.8
Family First	Nick Sciola	558	1.4	+1.4
Ind. (Protector)	John Tiger Casley	251	0.6	−0.2
Independent	Allan L. Timms	211	0.5	+0.5
Total formal votes		41,196	95.8	+0.1
Informal votes		1,786	4.2	−0.1
Turnout		42,982	89.1	+1.5
Two-party-preferred result
Liberal	James Newbury	22,710	55.1	+4.6
Labor	Louise Crawford	18,486	44.9	−4.6
Liberal hold		Swing	+4.6	

Two-party-preferred vote results in Brighton View source data.

== Historical maps ==
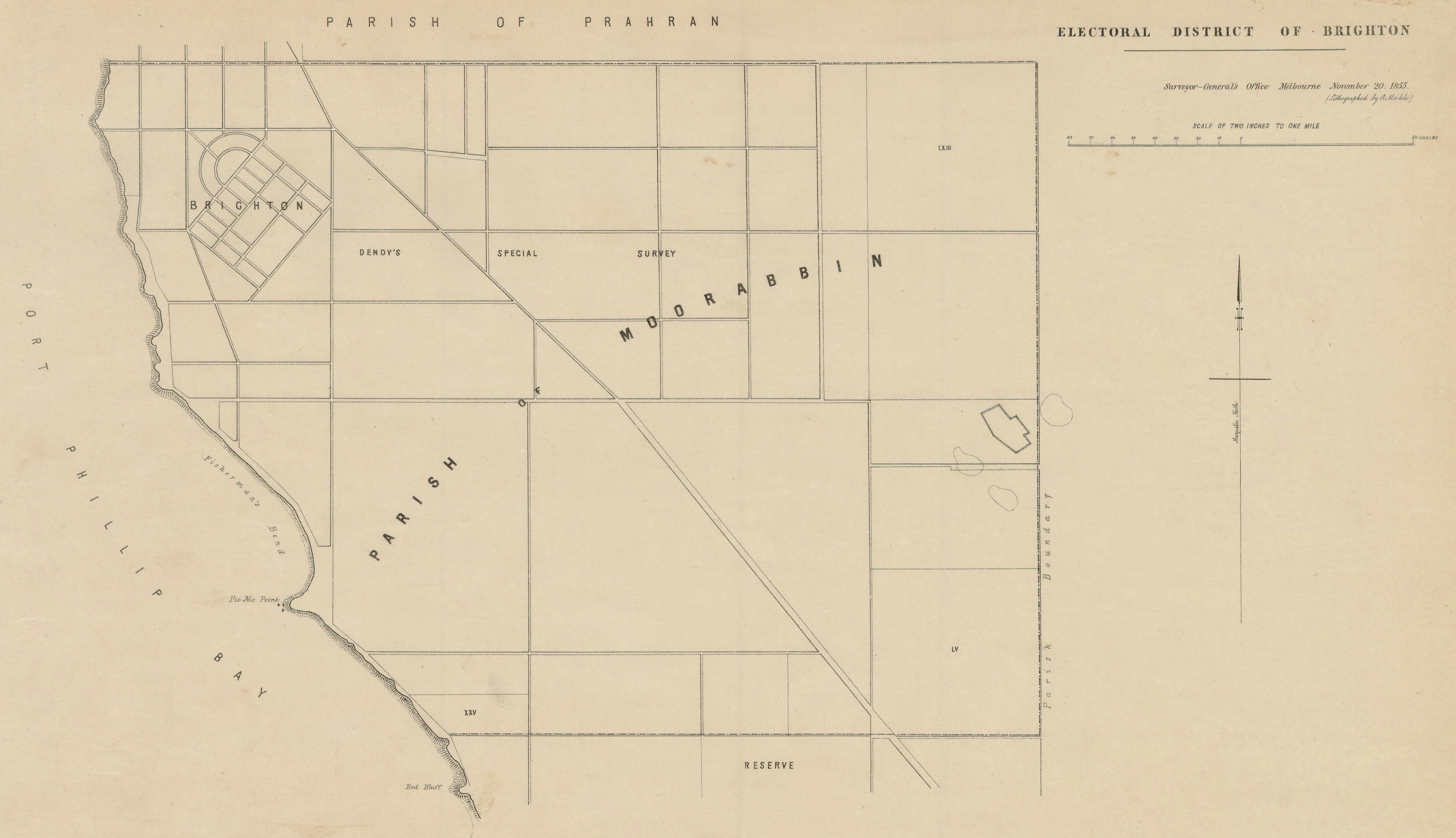
District of Brighton 1856

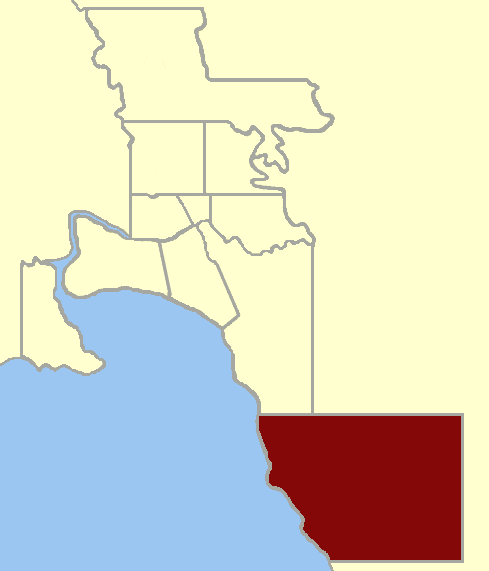
Location within Greater Melbourne area, 1859
