= Members of the Victorian Legislative Assembly, 2014–2018 =

- ←2010–2014 2018–2022→

This is a list of members of the Victorian Legislative Assembly from 2014 to 2018.

Name	Party	Electorate	Term in office
Hon Jacinta Allan	Labor	Bendigo East	1999–present
Hon Daniel Andrews	Labor	Mulgrave	2002–2023
Neil Angus	Liberal	Forest Hill	2010–2022
Hon Louise Asher	Liberal	Brighton	1999–2018
Brad Battin	Liberal	Gembrook	2010–present
Gary Blackwood	Liberal	Narracan	2006–2022
Lizzie Blandthorn	Labor	Pascoe Vale	2014–2022
Roma Britnell ^{[2]}	Liberal	South-West Coast	2015–present
Colin Brooks	Labor	Bundoora	2006–present
Josh Bull	Labor	Sunbury	2014–present
Tim Bull	National	Gippsland East	2010–present
Neale Burgess	Liberal	Hastings	2006–2022
Anthony Carbines	Labor	Ivanhoe	2010–present
Ben Carroll	Labor	Niddrie	2012–present
Hon Robert Clark	Liberal	Box Hill	1988–2018
Christine Couzens	Labor	Geelong	2014–present
Peter Crisp	National	Mildura	2006–2018
Hon Lily D'Ambrosio	Labor	Mill Park	2002–present
Steve Dimopoulos	Labor	Oakleigh	2014–present
Hon Luke Donnellan	Labor	Narre Warren North	2002–2022
Hon Martin Dixon	Liberal	Nepean	1996–2018
Paul Edbrooke	Labor	Frankston	2014–present
Maree Edwards	Labor	Bendigo West	2010–present
Hon John Eren	Labor	Lara	2006–present
Hon Martin Foley	Labor	Albert Park	2007–2022
Christine Fyffe	Liberal	Evelyn	1999–2002, 2006–2018
Hon Jane Garrett	Labor	Brunswick	2010–2018
Michael Gidley	Liberal	Mount Waverley	2010–2018
Judith Graley	Labor	Narre Warren South	2006–2018
Danielle Green	Labor	Yan Yean	2002–2022
Matthew Guy	Liberal	Bulleen	2014–present
Bronwyn Halfpenny	Labor	Thomastown	2010–present
Hon Jill Hennessy	Labor	Altona	2010–2022
Sam Hibbins	Greens	Prahran	2014–2024
David Hodgett	Liberal	Croydon	2006–present
Geoff Howard	Labor	Buninyong	1999–2018
Hon Natalie Hutchins	Labor	Sydenham	2010–present
Marlene Kairouz	Labor	Kororoit	2008-2022
Andrew Katos	Liberal	South Barwon	2010–2018
Emma Kealy	National	Lowan	2014–present
Sonya Kilkenny	Labor	Carrum	2014–present
Sharon Knight	Labor	Wendouree	2010–2018
Telmo Languiller	Labor	Tarneit	1999–2018
Hong Lim	Labor	Clarinda	1996–2018
Tim McCurdy	National	Ovens Valley	2010–present
Frank McGuire	Labor	Broadmeadows	2011–present
Cindy McLeish	Liberal	Eildon	2010–present
Hon James Merlino	Labor	Monbulk	2002–2022
David Morris	Liberal	Mornington	2006–2022
Hon Terry Mulder ^{[2]}	Liberal	Polwarth	1999–2015
Hon Denis Napthine ^{[2]}	Liberal	South-West Coast	1988–2015
Don Nardella	Labor/Independent ^{[3]}	Melton	1999–2018
Hon Lisa Neville	Labor	Bellarine	2002–2022
Hon Wade Noonan	Labor	Williamstown	2007–2018
Russell Northe	National/Independent ^{[5]}	Morwell	2006–2022
Danny O'Brien ^{[1]}	National	Gippsland South	2015–present
Hon Michael O'Brien	Liberal	Malvern	2006–present
Hon Martin Pakula	Labor	Keysborough	2013–2022
Hon Tim Pallas	Labor	Werribee	2006–2025
Brian Paynter	Liberal	Bass	2014–2018
Danny Pearson	Labor	Essendon	2014–present
Jude Perera	Labor	Cranbourne	2002–2018
John Pesutto	Liberal	Hawthorn	2014–2018, 2022–present
Hon Fiona Richardson ^{[4]}	Labor	Northcote	2006–2017
Tim Richardson	Labor	Mordialloc	2014–present
Richard Riordan ^{[2]}	Liberal	Polwarth	2015–present
Dee Ryall	Liberal	Ringwood	2010–2018
Hon Peter Ryan ^{[1]}	National	Gippsland South	1992–2015
Steph Ryan	National	Euroa	2014–2022
Ellen Sandell	Greens	Melbourne	2014–present
Suzanna Sheed	Independent	Shepparton	2014–present
Hon Robin Scott	Labor	Preston	2006–2022
Hon Ryan Smith	Liberal	Warrandyte	2006–2023
Tim Smith	Liberal	Kew	2014–2022
David Southwick	Liberal	Caulfield	2010–present
Ros Spence	Labor	Yuroke	2014–present
Nick Staikos	Labor	Bentleigh	2014–present
Louise Staley	Liberal	Ripon	2014–2022
Natalie Suleyman	Labor	St Albans	2014–present
Mary-Anne Thomas	Labor	Macedon	2014–present
Murray Thompson	Liberal	Sandringham	1992–2018
Marsha Thomson	Labor	Footscray	2006–2018
Lidia Thorpe ^{[4]}	Greens	Northcote	2017–2018
Bill Tilley	Liberal	Benambra	2006–present
Hon Heidi Victoria	Liberal	Bayswater	2006–2018
Nick Wakeling	Liberal	Ferntree Gully	2006–2022
Hon Peter Walsh	National	Murray Plains	2002–present
Vicki Ward	Labor	Eltham	2014–present
Graham Watt	Liberal	Burwood	2010–2018
Hon Kim Wells	Liberal	Rowville	1992–present
Gabrielle Williams	Labor	Dandenong	2014–present
Hon Richard Wynne	Labor	Richmond	1999–2022

^{1} On 2 February 2015, the Nationals member for Gippsland South and former Deputy Premier of Victoria, Peter Ryan, resigned. Nationals candidate Danny O'Brien won the resulting by-election on 14 March 2015.
^{2} On 3 September 2015, the Liberal members for South-West Coast (former Premier of Victoria Denis Napthine) and Polwarth (Terry Mulder) resigned. Liberal candidates Roma Britnell and Richard Riordan were elected at the resulting by-elections on 31 October for South-West Coast and Polwarth respectively.
^{3} Melton MLA Don Nardella resigned from the Labor Party on 7 March 2017 and now sits as an independent.
^{4} Northcote Labor MLA Fiona Richardson died on 23 August 2017. Greens candidate Lidia Thorpe won the resulting by-election on 18 November 2017.
^{5} Morwell MLA Russell Northe resigned from the National Party on 28 August 2017 and now sits as an independent.

== See also ==
- Women in the Victorian Legislative Assembly
