= Members of the Victorian Legislative Assembly, 2018–2022 =

- ←2014–2018 2022–2026→

This is a list of members of the Victorian Legislative Assembly from 2018 to 2022.

Name	Party	Electorate	Term in office
Hon Martin Foley	Labor	Albert Park	2007–2022
Hon Jill Hennessy	Labor	Altona	2010–2022
Jordan Crugnale	Labor	Bass	2018–present
Jackson Taylor	Labor	Bayswater	2018–present
Hon Lisa Neville	Labor	Bellarine	2002–2022
Bill Tilley	Liberal	Benambra	2006–present
Hon Jacinta Allan	Labor	Bendigo East	1999–present
Maree Edwards	Labor	Bendigo West	2010–present
Nick Staikos	Labor	Bentleigh	2014–present
Paul Hamer	Labor	Box Hill	2018–present
James Newbury	Liberal	Brighton	2018–present
Frank McGuire	Labor	Broadmeadows	2011–2022
Tim Read	Greens	Brunswick	2018–present
Matthew Guy	Liberal	Bulleen	2014–present
Colin Brooks	Labor	Bundoora	2006–present
Michaela Settle	Labor	Buninyong	2018–present
Will Fowles	Labor	Burwood	2018–present
Sonya Kilkenny	Labor	Carrum	2014–present
David Southwick	Liberal	Caulfield	2010–present
Meng Heang Tak	Labor	Clarinda	2018–present
Pauline Richards	Labor	Cranbourne	2018–present
David Hodgett	Liberal	Croydon	2006–present
Gabrielle Williams	Labor	Dandenong	2014–present
Cindy McLeish	Liberal	Eildon	2010–present
Vicki Ward	Labor	Eltham	2014–present
Danny Pearson	Labor	Essendon	2014–present
Steph Ryan	National	Euroa	2014–2022
Bridget Vallence	Liberal	Evelyn	2018–present
Nick Wakeling	Liberal	Ferntree Gully	2006–2022
Katie Hall	Labor	Footscray	2018–present
Neil Angus	Liberal	Forest Hill	2010–2022
Paul Edbrooke	Labor	Frankston	2014–present
Christine Couzens	Labor	Geelong	2014–present
Brad Battin	Liberal	Gembrook	2010–present
Tim Bull	National	Gippsland East	2010–present
Danny O'Brien	National	Gippsland South	2015–present
Neale Burgess	Liberal	Hastings	2006–2022
John Kennedy	Labor	Hawthorn	2018–2022
Anthony Carbines	Labor	Ivanhoe	2010–present
Tim Smith	Liberal	Kew	2014–2022
Hon Martin Pakula	Labor	Keysborough	2013–2022
Marlene Kairouz	Labor	Kororoit	2008–2022
Hon John Eren	Labor	Lara	2006–2022
Emma Kealy	National	Lowan	2014–present
Mary-Anne Thomas	Labor	Macedon	2014–present
Hon Michael O'Brien	Liberal	Malvern	2006–present
Ellen Sandell	Greens	Melbourne	2014–present
Steve McGhie	Labor	Melton	2018–present
Ali Cupper	Independent	Mildura	2018–2022
Hon Lily D'Ambrosio	Labor	Mill Park	2002–present
Hon James Merlino	Labor	Monbulk	2002–2022
Tim Richardson	Labor	Mordialloc	2014–present
David Morris	Liberal	Mornington	2006–2022
Russell Northe	Independent	Morwell	2006–2022
Matt Fregon	Labor	Mount Waverley	2018–present
Hon Daniel Andrews	Labor	Mulgrave	2002–2023
Hon Peter Walsh	National	Murray Plains	2002–present
Gary Blackwood	Liberal	Narracan	2006–2022
Hon Luke Donnellan	Labor	Narre Warren North	2002–2022
Gary Maas	Labor	Narre Warren South	2018–present
Chris Brayne	Labor	Nepean	2018–2022
Ben Carroll	Labor	Niddrie	2012–present
Kat Theophanous	Labor	Northcote	2018–present
Steve Dimopoulos	Labor	Oakleigh	2014–present
Tim McCurdy	National	Ovens Valley	2010–present
Lizzie Blandthorn	Labor	Pascoe Vale	2014–2022
Richard Riordan	Liberal	Polwarth	2015–present
Sam Hibbins	Greens	Prahran	2014–2024
Hon Robin Scott	Labor	Preston	2006–2022
Hon Richard Wynne	Labor	Richmond	1999–2022
Dustin Halse	Labor	Ringwood	2018–2022
Louise Staley	Liberal	Ripon	2014–2022
Hon Kim Wells	Liberal	Rowville	1992–present
Brad Rowswell	Liberal	Sandringham	2018–present
Suzanna Sheed	Independent	Shepparton	2014–2022
Darren Cheeseman	Labor	South Barwon	2018–present
Roma Britnell	Liberal	South-West Coast	2015–present
Natalie Suleyman	Labor	St Albans	2014–present
Josh Bull	Labor	Sunbury	2014–present
Hon Natalie Hutchins	Labor	Sydenham	2010–present
Sarah Connolly	Labor	Tarneit	2018–present
Bronwyn Halfpenny	Labor	Thomastown	2010–present
Hon Ryan Smith	Liberal	Warrandyte	2006–2023
Juliana Addison	Labor	Wendouree	2018–present
Hon Tim Pallas	Labor	Werribee	2006–2025
Melissa Horne	Labor	Williamstown	2018–present
Danielle Green	Labor	Yan Yean	2002–2022
Ros Spence	Labor	Yuroke	2014–present

== See also ==
- Women in the Victorian Legislative Assembly
