= Members of the Victorian Legislative Assembly, 2022–2026 =

- ←2018–2022 2026–2030→

Members of the Victorian Legislative Assembly who served in the 60th Parliament held their seats from 2022 to 2026.They were elected at the 2022 state election on 26 November 2022.

== Members ==
Name	Party	Electorate	Years in office
Juliana Addison	Labor	Wendouree	2018–present
Hon Jacinta Allan	Labor	Bendigo East	1999–present
Hon Daniel Andrews ^{[1]}	Labor	Mulgrave	2002–2023
Brad Battin	Liberal	Berwick	2010–present
Jade Benham	National	Mildura	2022–present
Roma Britnell	Liberal	South-West Coast	2015–present
Colin Brooks	Labor	Bundoora	2006–present
Josh Bull	Labor	Sunbury	2014–present
Tim Bull	National	Gippsland East	2010–present
Martin Cameron	National	Morwell	2022–present
Anthony Carbines	Labor	Ivanhoe	2010–present
Ben Carroll	Labor	Niddrie	2012–present
Anthony Cianflone	Labor	Pascoe Vale	2022–present
Darren Cheeseman	Labor/Independent Labor	South Barwon	2018–present
Annabelle Cleeland	National	Euroa	2022–present
Sarah Connolly	Labor	Laverton	2018–present
Christine Couzens	Labor	Geelong	2014–present
Chris Crewther	Liberal	Mornington	2022–present
Jordan Crugnale	Labor	Bass	2018–present
Hon Lily D'Ambrosio	Labor	Mill Park	2002–present
Daniela De Martino	Labor	Monbulk	2022–present
Gabrielle de Vietri	Greens	Richmond	2022–present
Steve Dimopoulos	Labor	Oakleigh	2014–present
Paul Edbrooke	Labor	Frankston	2014–present
Maree Edwards	Labor	Bendigo West	2010–present
Wayne Farnham ^{[2]}	Liberal	Narracan	2023–present
Eden Foster ^{[1]}	Labor	Mulgrave	2023–present
Will Fowles	Labor/Independent Labor/Independent	Ringwood	2018–present
Matt Fregon	Labor	Ashwood	2018–present
Ella George	Labor	Lara	2022–present
Luba Grigorovitch	Labor	Kororoit	2022–present
Sam Groth ^{[6]}	Liberal	Nepean	2022–2026
Hon Matthew Guy	Liberal	Bulleen	2014–present
Bronwyn Halfpenny	Labor	Thomastown	2010–present
Katie Hall	Labor	Footscray	2018–present
Paul Hamer	Labor	Box Hill	2018–present
Martha Haylett	Labor	Ripon	2022–present
Sam Hibbins ^{[4]}	Greens/Independent	Prahran	2014–2024
Mathew Hilakari	Labor	Point Cook	2022–present
David Hodgett	Liberal	Croydon	2006–present
Melissa Horne	Labor	Williamstown	2018–present
Hon Natalie Hutchins	Labor	Sydenham	2010–present
Lauren Kathage	Labor	Yan Yean	2022–present
Emma Kealy	National	Lowan	2014–present
Sonya Kilkenny	Labor	Carrum	2014–present
Nathan Lambert	Labor	Preston	2022–present
John Lister ^{[5]}	Labor	Werribee	2025–present
Gary Maas	Labor	Narre Warren South	2018–present
Alison Marchant	Labor	Bellarine	2022–present
Anthony Marsh ^{[6]}	Liberal	Nepean	2026–present
Kathleen Matthews-Ward	Labor	Broadmeadows	2022–present
Tim McCurdy	National	Ovens Valley	2010–present
Steve McGhie	Labor	Melton	2018–present
Cindy McLeish	Liberal	Eildon	2010–present
Paul Mercurio	Labor	Hastings	2022–present
John Mullahy	Labor	Glen Waverley	2022–present
James Newbury	Liberal	Brighton	2018–present
Danny O'Brien	National	Gippsland South	2015–present
Hon Michael O'Brien	Liberal	Malvern	2006–present
Kim O'Keeffe	National	Shepparton	2022–present
Hon Tim Pallas ^{[5]}	Labor	Werribee	2006–2025
Danny Pearson	Labor	Essendon	2014–present
John Pesutto	Liberal	Hawthorn	2014–2018, 2022–present
Tim Read	Greens	Brunswick	2018–2026
Pauline Richards	Labor	Cranbourne	2018–present
Tim Richardson	Labor	Mordialloc	2014–present
Richard Riordan	Liberal	Polwarth	2015–present
Brad Rowswell	Liberal	Sandringham	2018–present
Ellen Sandell	Greens	Melbourne	2014–present
Michaela Settle	Labor	Eureka	2018–present
Hon Ryan Smith ^{[3]}	Liberal	Warrandyte	2006–2023
David Southwick	Liberal	Caulfield	2010–present
Ros Spence	Labor	Kalkallo	2014–present
Nick Staikos	Labor	Bentleigh	2014–present
Natalie Suleyman	Labor	St Albans	2014–present
Meng Heang Tak	Labor	Clarinda	2018–present
Jackson Taylor	Labor	Bayswater	2018–present
Nina Taylor	Labor	Albert Park	2022–present
Kat Theophanous	Labor	Northcote	2018–present
Mary-Anne Thomas	Labor	Macedon	2014–present
Bill Tilley	Liberal	Benambra	2006–present
Bridget Vallence	Liberal	Evelyn	2018–present
Emma Vulin	Labor	Pakenham	2022–present
Hon Peter Walsh	National	Murray Plains	2002–present
Iwan Walters	Labor	Greenvale	2022–present
Vicki Ward	Labor	Eltham	2014–present
Hon Kim Wells	Liberal	Rowville	1992–present
Nicole Werner ^{[3]}	Liberal	Warrandyte	2023–present
Rachel Westaway ^{[4]}	Liberal	Prahran	2025–present
Dylan Wight	Labor	Tarneit	2022–present
Gabrielle Williams	Labor	Dandenong	2014–present
Belinda Wilson	Labor	Narre Warren North	2022–present
Jess Wilson	Liberal	Kew	2022–present

^{1} On 27 September 2023, the Labor member for Mulgrave and Premier of Victoria, Daniel Andrews, resigned. Labor candidate Eden Foster won the resulting by-election on 18 November 2023.
^{2} Due to the death of a nominated candidate before the 2022 Victorian state election, Wayne Farnham was elected as the Liberal member for Narracan at a supplementary election on 28 January 2023.
^{3} On 7 July 2023, the Liberal member for Warrandyte, Ryan Smith, resigned. Liberal candidate Nicole Werner was elected at the resulting by-election on 26 August 2023.
^{4} On 23 November 2024, the independent (formerly Greens) member for Prahran, Sam Hibbins, resigned. Liberal candidate Rachel Westaway won the resulting by-election on 8 February 2025.
^{5} On 6 January 2025, the Labor member for Werribee, Tim Pallas, resigned. Labor candidate John Lister won the resulting by-election on 8 February 2025.
^{6} On 13 February 2026, the Liberal member for Nepean, Sam Groth, resigned. Liberal candidate Anthony Marsh won the resulting by-election on 2 May 2026.

== See also ==
- Members of the Victorian Legislative Council, 2022–2026
- Women in the Victorian Legislative Assembly
