= Women in the Victorian Legislative Assembly =

List of Australian women

There have been 108 women in the Victorian Legislative Assembly since its establishment in 1856. Women have had the right to vote in Victoria, Australia since 1908 and the right to stand as a candidate for the Victorian Legislative Assembly since 1923.

The first successful female candidate for the Legislative Assembly was Millie Peacock, who was elected as a United Australia Party member for Allandale in a by-election in 1933, but she retired in 1935, stating that Parliament was "no place for a woman". Ivy Weber was the first woman to win a seat at a general election, winning Nunawading as an independent in 1937 (she was also the first female independent elected in Australia). She was joined in 1938 by Fanny Brownbill, Labor's first female member, elected at a by-election for the seat of Geelong. Weber resigned in 1943 and Brownbill died in 1948, after which there were no women in the Assembly until 1967, when Dorothy Goble was elected as the Liberal member for Mitcham. Since then there have continuously been female members in the Assembly.

The first female minister was Labor's Pauline Toner, who became a minister in 1982. Since then, the number of female members has continued to rise. Jeanette Powell was the first National Party member, elected to the Assembly in 2002. That election also brought 11 new Labor women into the Assembly. Since Ivy Weber, three other women, Susan Davies Suzanna Sheed and Ali Cupper have been elected to the Assembly as independents. Ellen Sandell was one of the two Greens candidates first elected to the Assembly at the 2014 state election.

Judy Maddigan became the first female Speaker in 2003. Since then, three other women, Jenny Lindell Christine Fyffe and Maree Edwards have served as Speaker. Maree Edwards has been the Speaker since 2022 and is the first female Speaker from a regional city electorate.

== List of women in the Victorian Legislative Assembly ==
Names in bold indicate women who have been appointed as Ministers or Parliamentary Secretaries during their time in Parliament. Names in italics indicate women who were first elected at a by-election, and * symbolises members that have sat as members in both the Legislative Assembly and the Legislative Council.

#	Name	Party	Electoral Division	Period of service
1	Millie, Lady Peacock	UAP	Allandale	1 November 1933 – 1 February 1935 (retired)
2	Ivy Weber	Independent	Nunawading	2 October 1937 – 18 July 1943 (resigned)
3	Fanny Brownbill	Labor	Geelong	11 June 1938 – 10 October 1948 (died)
4	Dorothy Goble	Liberal	Mitcham	29 April 1967 – 19 March 1976 (retired)
5	Jeannette Patrick	Liberal	Brighton	20 March 1976 – 24 January 1985 (retired)
6	**Pauline Toner**	Labor	Greensborough	5 November 1977 – 28 February 1989 (resigned)
7	Joan Chambers	Liberal	Ballarat South	5 May 1979 – 1 February 1982 (defeated)
8	Valerie Callister	Labor	Morwell	27 June 1981 – 30 September 1988 (retired)
9	Prue Sibree	Liberal	Kew	15 August 1981 – 1 February 1988 (resigned)
10	Jane Hill	Labor	Frankston; Frankston North	3 April 1982 – 1 March 1985; 2 March 1985 – 3 October 1992 (retired)
10	Margaret Ray	Labor	Box Hill	3 April 1982 – 3 October 1992 (defeated)
10	**Kay Setches**	Labor	Ringwood	3 April 1982 – 3 October 1992 (retired)
13	Beth Gleeson	Labor	Thomastown	2 March 1985 – 16 December 1989 (died)
13	Carolyn Hirsh*	Labor	Wantirna	2 March 1985 – 3 October 1992 (defeated)
13	Jan Wilson	Labor	Dandenong North	2 March 1985 – 18 September 1999 (retired)
16	**Jan Wade**	Liberal	Kew	19 March 1988 – 17 September 1999 (retired)
17	**Ann Barker**	Labor	Bentleigh; Oakleigh	1 October 1988 – 3 October 1992 (defeated); 18 September 1999 – 29 November 2014 (retired)
17	**Joan Kirner***	Labor	Williamstown	1 October 1988 – 27 May 1994 (resigned)
19	**Sherryl Garbutt**	Labor	Greensborough; Bundoora	15 April 1989 – 2 October 1992; 3 October 1992 – 24 November 2006 (retired)
20	**Lorraine Elliott**	Liberal	Mooroolbark	3 October 1992 – 30 November 2002 (retired)
20	**Ann Henderson**	Liberal	Geelong	3 October 1992 – 18 September 1999 (defeated)
20	Carole Marple	Labor	Altona	3 October 1992 – 30 March 1996 (retired)
20	Denise McGill	Liberal	Oakleigh	3 October 1992 – 18 September 1999 (defeated)
20	Inga Peulich*	Liberal	Bentleigh	3 October 1992 – 30 November 2002 (defeated)
20	**Marie Tehan***	Liberal	Seymour	3 October 1992 – 18 September 1999 (retired)
26	**Leonie Burke**	Liberal	Prahran	30 March 1996 – 30 November 2002 (retired)
26	**Christine Campbell**	Labor	Pascoe Vale	30 March 1996 – 29 November 2014 (retired)
26	**Mary Gillett**	Labor	Werribee; Tarneit	30 March 1996 – 29 November 2002; 30 November 2002 – 25 November 2006 (retired)
26	**Lynne Kosky**	Labor	Altona	30 March 1996 – 18 January 2010 (resigned)
26	Andrea McCall	Liberal	Frankston	30 March 1996 – 30 November 2002 (defeated)
26	Judy Maddigan	Labor	Essendon	30 March 1996 – 27 November 2010 (retired)
26	Helen Shardey	Liberal	Caulfield	30 March 1996 – 27 November 2010 (retired)
33	Susan Davies	Independent	Gippsland West	1 February 1997 – 29 November 2002 (defeated)
34	**Mary Delahunty**	Labor	Northcote	15 September 1998 – 24 November 2006 (retired)
35	**Jacinta Allan**	Labor	Bendigo East	18 September 1999 –
35	**Louise Asher***	Liberal	Brighton	18 September 1999 – 24 November 2018 (retired)
35	**Liz Beattie**	Labor	Tullamarine; Yuroke	18 September 1999 – 30 November 2002; 30 November 2002 – 29 November 2014 (retired)
35	Joanne Duncan	Labor	Gisborne; Macedon	18 September 1999 – 30 November 2002; 30 November 2002 – 29 November 2014 (retired)
35	Christine Fyffe	Liberal	Evelyn	18 September 1999 – 30 November 2002 (defeated); 25 November 2006 – 24 November 2018 (retired)
35	Jenny Lindell	Labor	Carrum	18 September 1999 – 27 November 2010 (defeated)
35	Karen Overington	Labor	Ballarat West	18 September 1999 – 27 November 2010 (retired)
35	**Bronwyn Pike**	Labor	Melbourne	18 September 1999 – 7 May 2012 (resigned)
43	Denise Allen	Labor	Benalla	13 May 2000 – 29 November 2002 (defeated)
44	Dympna Beard	Labor	Kilsyth	30 November 2002 – 25 November 2006 (defeated)
44	Rosy Buchanan	Labor	Hastings	30 November 2002 – 25 November 2006 (defeated)
44	**Lily D'Ambrosio**	Labor	Mill Park	30 November 2002 –
44	Anne Eckstein	Labor	Ferntree Gully	30 November 2002 – 25 November 2006 (defeated)
44	**Danielle Green**	Labor	Yan Yean	30 November 2002 – 26 November 2022 (retired)
44	Tammy Lobato	Labor	Gembrook	30 November 2002 – 27 November 2010 (defeated)
44	Kirstie Marshall	Labor	Forest Hill	30 November 2002 – 27 November 2010 (defeated)
44	Heather McTaggart	Labor	Evelyn	30 November 2002 – 25 November 2006 (defeated)
44	**Maxine Morand**	Labor	Mount Waverley	30 November 2002 – 27 November 2010 (defeated)
44	Janice Munt	Labor	Mordialloc	30 November 2002 – 27 November 2010 (defeated)
44	**Lisa Neville**	Labor	Bellarine	30 November 2002 – 26 November 2022 (retired)
44	**Jeanette Powell***	National	Shepparton	30 November 2002 – 29 November 2014 (retired)
56	Judith Graley	Labor	Narre Warren South	25 November 2006 – 24 November 2018 (retired)
56	**Fiona Richardson**	Labor	Northcote	25 November 2006 – 23 August 2017 (died)
56	**Marsha Thomson***	Labor	Footscray	25 November 2006 – 24 November 2018 (retired)
56	**Heidi Victoria**	Liberal	Bayswater	25 November 2006 – 24 November 2018 (defeated)
56	**Mary Wooldridge***	Liberal	Doncaster	25 November 2006 – 29 November 2014 (transferred to LC)
61	**Marlene Kairouz**	Labor	Kororoit	28 June 2008 – 26 November 2022 (retired)
62	**Jill Hennessy**	Labor	Altona	13 February 2010 – 26 November 2022 (retired)
63	Donna Bauer	Liberal	Carrum	27 November 2010 – 29 November 2014 (defeated)
63	Maree Edwards	Labor	Bendigo West	27 November 2010 –
63	**Jane Garrett***	Labor	Brunswick	27 November 2010 – 24 November 2018 (transferred to LC)
63	Bronwyn Halfpenny	Labor	Thomastown	27 November 2010 –
63	**Natalie Hutchins**	Labor	Keilor; Sydenham	27 November 2010 – 29 November 2014; 29 November 2014 –
63	Sharon Knight	Labor	Ballarat West; Wendouree	27 November 2010 – 29 November 2014; 29 November 2014 – 24 November 2018 (retired)
63	Cindy McLeish	Liberal	Seymour; Eildon	27 November 2010 – 29 November 2014; 29 November 2014 –
63	Elizabeth Miller	Liberal	Bentleigh	27 November 2010 – 29 November 2014 (defeated)
63	Dee Ryall	Liberal	Mitcham; Ringwood	27 November 2010 – 29 November 2014; 29 November 2014 – 24 November 2018 (defeated)
63	Lorraine Wreford	Liberal	Mordialloc	27 November 2010 – 29 November 2014 (defeated)
73	Jennifer Kanis	Labor	Melbourne	21 July 2012 – 29 November 2014 (defeated)
74	Lizzie Blandthorn	Labor	Pascoe Vale	29 November 2014 – 26 November 2022 (transferred to LC)
74	Christine Couzens	Labor	Geelong	29 November 2014 –
74	Emma Kealy	National	Lowan	29 November 2014 –
74	Sonya Kilkenny	Labor	Carrum	29 November 2014 –
74	Steph Ryan	National	Euroa	29 November 2014 – 26 November 2022 (retired)
74	Ellen Sandell	Greens	Melbourne	29 November 2014 –
74	Suzanna Sheed	Independent	Shepparton	29 November 2014 – 26 November 2022 (defeated)
74	Ros Spence	Labor	Yuroke	29 November 2014 –
74	Louise Staley	Liberal	Ripon	29 November 2014 – 26 November 2022 (defeated)
74	Natalie Suleyman	Labor	St Albans	29 November 2014 –
74	Mary-Anne Thomas	Labor	Macedon	29 November 2014 –
74	Vicki Ward	Labor	Eltham	29 November 2014 –
74	**Gabrielle Williams**	Labor	Dandenong	29 November 2014 –
87	Roma Britnell	Liberal	South-West Coast	31 October 2015 –
88	Lidia Thorpe	Greens	Northcote	18 November 2017 – 24 November 2018 (defeated)
89	Juliana Addison	Labor	Wendouree	24 November 2018 –
89	Sarah Connolly	Labor	Tarneit	24 November 2018 –
89	Jordan Crugnale	Labor	Bass	24 November 2018 –
89	Ali Cupper	Independent	Mildura	24 November 2018 – 26 November 2022 (defeated)
89	Katie Hall	Labor	Footscray	24 November 2018 –
89	**Melissa Horne**	Labor	Williamstown	24 November 2018 –
89	Pauline Richards	Labor	Cranbourne	24 November 2018 –
89	Michaela Settle	Labor	Buninyong	24 November 2018 –
89	Kat Theophanous	Labor	Northcote	24 November 2018 –
89	Bridget Vallence	Liberal	Evelyn	24 November 2018 –
99	**Nina Taylor***	Labor	Albert Park	26 November 2022 –
99	Alison Marchant	Labor	Bellarine	26 November 2022 –
99	Kathleen Matthews-Ward	Labor	Broadmeadows	26 November 2022 –
99	Annabelle Cleeland	National	Euroa	26 November 2022 –
99	Jess Wilson	Liberal	Kew	26 November 2022 –
99	Luba Grigorovitch	Labor	Kororoit	26 November 2022 –
99	Ella George	Labor	Lara	26 November 2022 –
99	Jade Benham	National	Mildura	26 November 2022 –
99	Daniela De Martino	Labor	Monbulk	26 November 2022 –
99	Belinda Wilson	Labor	Narre Warren North	26 November 2022 –
99	Emma Vulin	Labor	Pakenham	26 November 2022 –
99	Gabrielle de Vietri	Greens	Richmond	26 November 2022 –
99	Martha Haylett	Labor	Ripon	26 November 2022 –
99	Kim O'Keeffe	National	Shepparton	26 November 2022 –
99	Lauren Kathage	Labor	Yan Yean	26 November 2022 –
114	Nicole Werner	Liberal	Warrandyte	26 August 2023 -
115	Eden Foster	Labor	Mulgrave	18 November 2023 -
116	Rachel Westaway	Liberal	Prahran	8 February 2025 -

== Proportion of women in the Assembly ==
Numbers and proportions are as they were directly after the relevant election and do not take into account by-elections, defections or other changes in membership. The Liberal column also includes that party's predecessor, the United Australia and Liberal & Country parties.

Term	Labor			Liberal			National			Others			Total		
Term	Women	Total	%	Women	Total	%	Women	Total	%	Women	Total	%	Women	Total	%
1932–1935	0	16	0.0%	0	31	0.0%	0	14	0.0%	0	4	0.0%	0	65	0.0%
1935–1937	0	17	0.0%	0	25	0.0%	0	20	0.0%	0	3	0.0%	0	65	0.0%
1937–1940	0	20	0.0%	0	21	0.0%	0	20	0.0%	1	4	25.0%	1	65	1.5%
1940–1943	1	22	4.5%	0	16	0.0%	0	22	0.0%	1	5	20.0%	2	65	3.1%
1943–1945	1	22	4.5%	0	13	0.0%	0	25	0.0%	1	5	20.0%	2	65	3.1%
1945–1947	1	31	3.2%	0	10	0.0%	0	18	0.0%	0	6	0.0%	1	65	1.5%
1947–1950	1	17	5.9%	0	27	0.0%	0	20	0.0%	0	1	0.0%	1	65	1.5%
1950–1952	0	24	0.0%	0	27	0.0%	0	13	0.0%	0	1	0.0%	0	65	0.0%
1952–1955	0	37	0.0%	0	11	0.0%	0	12	0.0%	0	5	0.0%	0	65	0.0%
1955–1958	0	20	0.0%	0	33	0.0%	0	11	0.0%	0	2	0.0%	0	66	0.0%
1958–1961	0	18	0.0%	0	39	0.0%	0	9	0.0%	0	0	0.0%	0	66	0.0%
1961–1964	0	17	0.0%	0	39	0.0%	0	9	0.0%	0	1	0.0%	0	66	0.0%
1964–1967	0	18	0.0%	0	38	0.0%	0	10	0.0%	0	0	0.0%	0	66	0.0%
1967–1970	0	16	0.0%	1	44	2.3%	0	12	0.0%	0	1	0.0%	1	73	1.4%
1970–1973	0	22	0.0%	1	42	2.4%	0	8	0.0%	0	1	0.0%	1	73	1.4%
1973–1976	0	18	0.0%	1	46	2.2%	0	8	0.0%	0	1	0.0%	1	73	1.4%
1976–1979	0	21	0.0%	1	52	1.9%	0	7	0.0%	0	1	0.0%	1	81	1.2%
1979–1982	1	32	3.1%	2	41	4.9%	0	8	0.0%	0	0	0.0%	3	81	3.7%
1982–1985	5	49	10.2%	2	24	8.3%	0	8	0.0%	0	0	0.0%	7	81	8.6%
1985–1988	8	47	17.0%	1	31	3.2%	0	10	0.0%	0	0	0.0%	9	88	10.2%
1988–1992	9	46	19.6%	1	33	3.0%	0	9	0.0%	0	0	0.0%	10	88	11.3%
1992–1996	4	27	14.8%	6	52	11.5%	0	9	0.0%	0	0	0.0%	10	88	11.3%
1996–1999	6	29	20.7%	9	49	18.4%	0	9	0.0%	0	1	0.0%	15	88	17.0%
1999–2002	13	42	31.0%	7	36	19.4%	0	7	0.0%	1	3	33.3%	21	88	23.9%
2002–2006	24	62	38.7%	2	17	11.8%	1	7	14.3%	0	2	0.0%	27	88	30.7%
2006–2010	20	55	36.4%	5	23	21.7%	1	9	11.1%	0	1	0.0%	26	88	29.5%
2010–2014	19	43	44.2%	9	35	25.7%	1	10	10.0%	0	0	0.0%	29	88	33.0%
2014–2018	22	47	46.8%	6	30	20.0%	2	8	25.0%	2	3	66.7%	32	88	36.4%
2018–2022	25	55	45.5%	4	21	19.0%	2	6	33.3%	3	6	50.0%	34	88	38.6%
2022–	30	56	53.6%	6	19	31.6%	4	9	44.4%	2	4	50.0%	40	88	45.4%
