= Electoral results for the district of Cranbourne =

Victoria, Australia, district election results

This is a list of electoral results for the district of Cranbourne in Victorian state elections.

== Members for Cranbourne ==
Member	Party	Term
Gary Rowe	Liberal	1992–2002
Jude Perera	Labor	2002–2018
Pauline Richards	Labor	2018–present

== Election results ==
=== Elections in the 2020s ===
==== 2022 ====
2022 Victorian state election: Cranbourne
Party	Candidate	Votes	%	±%
Labor	Pauline Richards	18,853	46.2	−2.5
Liberal	Jagdeep Singh	11,230	27.5	−6.9
Greens	Kiran Vempati	2,282	5.6	+1.6
Family First	Bradley Harvey	2,249	5.5	+5.5
Democratic Labour	Chris Norton	2,044	5.0	+3.4
Freedom	Gerardine Frances Hansen	1,790	4.4	+4.4
Justice	Peter Bernard Philpott	1,126	2.7	−1.9
Animal Justice	Gwynne Brennan	1,006	2.5	+2.5
Independent	Ravi Ragupathy	242	0.6	+0.6
Total formal votes		40,822	92.7	+0.4
Informal votes		3,234	7.3	−0.4
Turnout		44,056	86.1	+6.2
Two-party-preferred result
Labor	Pauline Richards	24,073	59.0	−0.3
Liberal	Jagdeep Singh	16,749	41.0	+0.3
Labor hold		Swing	−0.3	

=== Elections in the 2010s ===
==== 2018 ====
2018 Victorian state election: Cranbourne
Party	Candidate	Votes	%	±%
Labor	Pauline Richards	25,725	50.29	+6.91
Liberal	Ann-Marie Hermans	16,483	32.22	−9.08
Justice	Jason Soultanidis	2,288	4.47	+4.47
Greens	Jake Tilton	2,008	3.93	−0.24
Transport Matters	Tarlochan Singh	1,827	3.57	+3.57
Australia First	Susan Jakobi	1,265	2.47	+2.47
Democratic Labour	Edward Sok	933	1.82	+1.82
Independent	Norman Fosberry	465	0.91	+0.91
Independent	Ravi Ragupathy	164	0.32	+0.32
Total formal votes		51,158	92.37	−1.07
Informal votes		4,227	7.63	+1.07
Turnout		55,385	89.60	−3.82
Two-party-preferred result
Labor	Pauline Richards	31,291	60.98	+8.65
Liberal	Ann-Marie Hermans	20,021	39.02	−8.65
Labor hold		Swing	+8.65	

==== 2014 ====
2014 Victorian state election: Cranbourne
Party	Candidate	Votes	%	±%
Labor	Jude Perera	17,365	43.4	+1.4
Liberal	Geoff Ablett	16,536	41.3	+0.9
Greens	Nagaraj Nayak	1,668	4.2	−2.7
Sex Party	Laith Graham	1,110	2.8	+2.6
Rise Up Australia	Jonathan Eli	995	2.5	+2.5
Family First	Pamela Keenan	979	2.4	−1.6
Independent	Rosemary Blake	824	2.1	+2.1
Christians	Rania Michael	560	1.4	+1.4
Total formal votes		40,037	93.4	−0.0
Informal votes		2,810	6.6	+0.0
Turnout		42,847	93.4	+10.9
Two-party-preferred result
Labor	Jude Perera	20,954	52.3	+1.3
Liberal	Geoff Ablett	19,083	47.7	−1.3
Labor hold		Swing	+1.3	

==== 2010 ====
2010 Victorian state election: Cranbourne
Party	Candidate	Votes	%	±%
Labor	Jude Perera	17,803	42.49	−12.61
Liberal	Geoff Ablett	16,565	39.53	+6.50
Greens	Hilary Bray	3,475	8.29	+2.58
Family First	Steve Funke	1,410	3.36	−2.80
Democratic Labor	Luke O'Connor	1,358	3.24	+3.24
Independent	Amanda Stapledon	921	2.20	+2.20
Independent	Bob Halsall	372	0.89	+0.89
Total formal votes		41,904	93.83	−0.52
Informal votes		2,754	6.17	+0.52
Turnout		44,658	92.89	−0.67
Two-party-preferred result
Labor	Jude Perera	21,774	51.84	−9.45
Liberal	Geoff Ablett	20,229	48.16	+9.45
Labor hold		Swing	−9.45	

=== Elections in the 2000s ===
==== 2006 ====
2006 Victorian state election: Cranbourne
Party	Candidate	Votes	%	±%
Labor	Jude Perera	19,719	55.10	+0.86
Liberal	Luke Martin	11,818	33.03	−3.47
Family First	Mark Hermans	2,206	6.16	+6.16
Greens	Hilary Bray	2,042	5.71	−2.13
Total formal votes		35,785	94.35	−1.88
Informal votes		2,144	5.65	+1.88
Turnout		37,929	93.56	−0.07
Two-party-preferred result
Labor	Jude Perera	21,927	61.29	+0.50
Liberal	Luke Martin	13,851	38.71	−0.50
Labor hold		Swing	+0.50	

==== 2002 ====
2002 Victorian state election: Cranbourne
Party	Candidate	Votes	%	±%
Labor	Jude Perera	16,619	54.2	+7.9
Liberal	Gary Rowe	11,185	36.5	−10.4
Greens	Gareth Kennedy	2,402	7.8	+7.4
Citizens Electoral Council	Heather Stanton	435	1.4	+1.4
Total formal votes		30,641	96.2	−0.3
Informal votes		1,202	3.8	+0.3
Turnout		31,843	93.6	
Two-party-preferred result
Labor	Jude Perera	18,614	60.8	+9.7
Liberal	Gary Rowe	12,000	39.2	−9.7
Labor gain from Liberal		Swing	+9.7	

=== Elections in the 1990s ===
==== 1999 ====
1999 Victorian state election: Cranbourne
Party	Candidate	Votes	%	±%
Liberal	Gary Rowe	20,444	54.2	−4.8
Labor	Jude Perera	14,892	39.5	−1.5
Independent	Carol McCormack	2,379	6.3	+6.3
Total formal votes		37,715	97.4	+0.1
Informal votes		997	2.6	−0.1
Turnout		38,712	94.2	
Two-party-preferred result
Liberal	Gary Rowe	21,002	55.7	−3.4
Labor	Jude Perera	16,708	44.3	+3.4
Liberal hold		Swing	−3.4	

==== 1996 ====
1996 Victorian state election: Cranbourne
Party	Candidate	Votes	%	±%
Liberal	Gary Rowe	20,912	59.1	+4.4
Labor	Dale Wilson	14,501	40.9	−4.4
Total formal votes		35,413	97.3	+1.2
Informal votes		990	2.7	−1.2
Turnout		36,403	95.6	
Liberal hold		Swing	+4.4	

==== 1992 ====
1992 Victorian state election: Cranbourne
Party	Candidate	Votes	%	±%
Liberal	Gary Rowe	15,949	51.8	+6.1
Labor	Ray Bastin	11,271	36.6	−10.6
Independent	Donald Brooke	763	2.5	+2.5
Independent	Lorelle O'Riley	703	2.3	+2.3
Independent	Bill McCluskey	652	2.1	+2.1
Natural Law	Gary Nelson	558	1.8	+1.8
Independent	Carol Fisher	542	1.8	+1.8
Independent	Eddy Van Eck	336	1.1	+1.1
Total formal votes		30,774	96.0	−0.7
Informal votes		1,267	4.0	+0.7
Turnout		32,041	96.8	
Two-party-preferred result
Liberal	Gary Rowe	16,771	54.7	+6.1
Labor	Ray Bastin	13,886	45.3	−6.1
Liberal gain from Labor		Swing	+6.1	
