= Electoral results for the district of South-West Coast =

Victoria, Australia, district election results

This is a list of electoral results for the Electoral district of South-West Coast in Victorian state elections.

== Members for South-West Coast ==
| Member | Party | Term |
|---|---|---|
| Denis Napthine | Liberal | 2002–2015 |
| Roma Britnell | Liberal | 2015–present |

== Election results ==
=== Elections in the 2020s ===
2022 Victorian state election: South-West Coast
| Party | Candidate | Votes | % | ±% |
|---|---|---|---|---|
| Liberal | Roma Britnell | 19,517 | 42.9 | +8.5 |
| Labor | Kylie Gaston | 9,640 | 21.2 | −3.4 |
| Independent | Carol Altmann | 6,564 | 14.4 | +14.4 |
| Independent | James Purcell | 2,737 | 6.0 | –9.4 |
| Greens | Thomas Campbell | 2,457 | 5.4 | −0.8 |
| Independent | Jim Doukas | 1,865 | 4.1 | +4.1 |
| Family First | Chris Brunt | 924 | 2.0 | +2.0 |
| Animal Justice | Jacinta Anderson | 688 | 1.5 | +1.3 |
| Independent | Michael McCluskey | 616 | 1.4 | +0.5 |
| Justice | James Brash Grimley | 488 | 1.1 | +1.1 |
| Total formal votes | | 45,496 | 94.3 | +0.9 |
| Informal votes | | 2,395 | 5.7 | −0.9 |
| Turnout | | 48,219 | 90.8 | |
Two-party-preferred result
| Liberal | Roma Britnell | 26,410 | 58.0 | +4.8 |
| Labor | Kylie Gaston | 19,086 | 42.0 | −4.8 |
| Liberal hold | | Swing | +4.8 | |

=== Elections in the 2010s ===
2018 Victorian state election: South-West Coast
| Party | Candidate | Votes | % | ±% |
|---|---|---|---|---|
| Liberal | Roma Britnell | 13,297 | 32.38 | −24.59 |
| Labor | Kylie Gaston | 10,074 | 24.53 | −3.68 |
| Independent | James Purcell | 6,763 | 16.47 | +16.47 |
| Independent | Michael Neoh | 3,735 | 9.10 | +9.10 |
| Country | Jim Doukas | 3,352 | 8.16 | +8.16 |
| Greens | Thomas Campbell | 2,540 | 6.19 | −3.61 |
| Democratic Labour | Joseph Purtill | 682 | 1.66 | +1.66 |
| Independent | Michael McCluskey | 384 | 0.94 | −0.67 |
| Victorian Socialists | Terry Riggs | 238 | 0.58 | +0.58 |
| Total formal votes | | 41,065 | 93.31 | −2.65 |
| Informal votes | | 2,943 | 6.69 | +2.65 |
| Turnout | | 44,008 | 92.65 | −2.28 |
Two-party-preferred result
| Liberal | Roma Britnell | 21,483 | 52.31 | −8.66 |
| Labor | Kylie Gaston | 19,582 | 47.69 | +8.66 |
| Liberal hold | | Swing | −8.66 | |

2015 South-West Coast state by-election
| Party | Candidate | Votes | % | ±% |
|---|---|---|---|---|
| Liberal | Roma Britnell | 15,442 | 40.0 | −17.0 |
| Independent | Roy Reekie | 6,501 | 16.8 | +16.8 |
| National | Michael Neoh | 5,560 | 14.4 | +14.4 |
| Country | Jim Doukas | 3,996 | 10.4 | +8.0 |
| Greens | Thomas Campbell | 2,925 | 7.6 | −2.2 |
| Independent | Swampy Marsh | 1,131 | 2.9 | +2.9 |
| Independent | Pete Smith | 693 | 1.8 | +1.8 |
| Independent | Rodney Van de Hoef | 673 | 1.7 | +1.7 |
| Independent | Michael McCluskey | 612 | 1.6 | −0.0 |
| Christians | Lillian Len | 578 | 1.5 | +1.5 |
| Animal Justice | Jennifer Gamble | 487 | 1.3 | +1.3 |
| Total formal votes | | 38,598 | 93.8 | −2.2 |
| Informal votes | | 2,573 | 6.2 | +2.2 |
| Turnout | | 41,171 | 90.8 | (−4.1) |
Two-candidate-preferred result
| Liberal | Roma Britnell | 23,381 | 60.6 | −0.4 |
| Independent | Roy Reekie | 15,217 | 39.4 | +39.4 |
| Liberal hold | | Swing | −0.4 | |

2014 Victorian state election: South-West Coast
| Party | Candidate | Votes | % | ±% |
|---|---|---|---|---|
| Liberal | Denis Napthine | 23,234 | 57.0 | +7.7 |
| Labor | Roy Reekie | 11,507 | 28.2 | +3.6 |
| Greens | Thomas Campbell | 3,993 | 9.8 | +1.6 |
| Country Alliance | Steven Moore | 945 | 2.3 | −1.2 |
| Independent | Michael McCluskey | 654 | 1.6 | +1.6 |
| Independent | Linda K. Smith | 449 | 1.1 | +1.1 |
| Total formal votes | | 40,782 | 96.0 | −0.0 |
| Informal votes | | 1,715 | 4.0 | +0.0 |
| Turnout | | 42,497 | 94.9 | +1.8 |
Two-party-preferred result
| Liberal | Denis Napthine | 24,914 | 61.0 | −0.9 |
| Labor | Roy Reekie | 15,947 | 39.0 | +0.9 |
| Liberal hold | | Swing | −0.9 | |

2010 Victorian state election: South-West Coast
| Party | Candidate | Votes | % | ±% |
|---|---|---|---|---|
| Liberal | Denis Napthine | 19,316 | 49.28 | +3.98 |
| Labor | John Herbertson | 9,658 | 24.64 | −13.68 |
| Independent | James Purcell | 4,519 | 11.53 | +11.53 |
| Greens | Jack Howard | 3,228 | 8.24 | +2.86 |
| Country Alliance | Tony Arscott | 1,394 | 3.56 | +3.56 |
| Family First | Craig Haberfield | 1,081 | 2.76 | −0.64 |
| Total formal votes | | 39,196 | 95.97 | +0.16 |
| Informal votes | | 1,644 | 4.04 | −0.16 |
| Turnout | | 40,840 | 94.22 | +0.85 |
Two-party-preferred result
| Liberal | Denis Napthine | 24,252 | 61.90 | +7.89 |
| Labor | John Herbertson | 14,926 | 38.10 | −7.89 |
| Liberal hold | | Swing | +7.89 | |

=== Elections in the 2000s ===
2006 Victorian state election: South-West Coast
| Party | Candidate | Votes | % | ±% |
|---|---|---|---|---|
| Liberal | Denis Napthine | 16,754 | 45.3 | +5.0 |
| Labor | Roy Reekie | 14,162 | 38.3 | −3.0 |
| Greens | Phoebe Adams | 1,991 | 5.4 | −1.6 |
| National | David O'Brien | 1,566 | 4.2 | −7.3 |
| Family First | Barry Wilson | 1,257 | 3.4 | +3.4 |
| People Power | Mike Noske | 1,241 | 3.4 | +3.4 |
| Total formal votes | | 36,981 | 95.8 | −1.1 |
| Informal votes | | 1,618 | 4.2 | +1.1 |
| Turnout | | 38,599 | 93.4 | |
Two-party-preferred result
| Liberal | Denis Napthine | 19,982 | 54.0 | +3.3 |
| Labor | Roy Reekie | 17,018 | 46.0 | −3.3 |
| Liberal hold | | Swing | +3.3 | |

2002 Victorian state election: South-West Coast
| Party | Candidate | Votes | % | ±% |
|---|---|---|---|---|
| Labor | Roy Reekie | 15,161 | 41.3 | +6.5 |
| Liberal | Denis Napthine | 14,809 | 40.3 | +0.7 |
| National | Gerald Madden | 4,213 | 11.5 | −0.5 |
| Greens | Gillian Blair | 2,568 | 7.0 | +5.3 |
| Total formal votes | | 36,751 | 96.9 | −0.4 |
| Informal votes | | 1,183 | 3.1 | +0.4 |
| Turnout | | 37,934 | 94.6 | |
Two-party-preferred result
| Liberal | Denis Napthine | 18,647 | 50.7 | −4.2 |
| Labor | Roy Reekie | 18,104 | 49.3 | +4.2 |
| Liberal hold | | Swing | −4.2 | |
