= Electoral results for the district of Narre Warren South =

Victoria, Australia, district election results

This is a list of electoral results for the Electoral district of Narre Warren South in Victorian state elections.

== Members for Narre Warren South ==
Member	Party	Term
Dale Wilson	Labor	2002–2006
Judith Graley	Labor	2006–2018
Gary Maas	Labor	2018–present

== Election results ==
=== Elections in the 2020s ===
2022 Victorian state election: Narre Warren South
Party	Candidate	Votes	%	±%
Labor	Gary Maas	20,562	48.0	−4.1
Liberal	Annette Samuel	12,280	28.7	−4.5
Greens	Susanna Moore	2,836	6.6	+0.9
Family First	Jacqueline Harvey	2,495	5.8	+5.8
Freedom	Geoff Hansen	2,136	5.0	+5.0
Liberal Democrats	Christine Skrobo	1,212	2.8	+2.8
Animal Justice	Michael Gallagher	1,048	2.4	+2.4
Independent	Tylere Baker-Pearce	290	0.7	+0.7
Total formal votes		42,859	92.7	–0.2
Informal votes		2,177	7.3	+0.2
Turnout		46,208	86.5	
Two-party-preferred result
Labor	Gary Maas	25,059	58.5	−1.9
Liberal	Annette Samuel	17,780	41.5	+1.9
Labor hold		Swing	−1.9	

=== Elections in the 2010s ===
2018 Victorian state election: Narre Warren South
Party	Candidate	Votes	%	±%
Labor	Gary Maas	20,797	49.93	+1.75
Liberal	Susan Serey	15,822	37.99	−2.06
Greens	Michael Butler	2,714	6.52	+0.43
Transport Matters	Gagandeep Singh	2,317	5.56	+5.56
Total formal votes		41,650	93.35	−1.02
Informal votes		2,967	6.65	+1.02
Turnout		44,617	90.12	−3.49
Two-party-preferred result
Labor	Gary Maas	23,690	56.90	+1.40
Liberal	Susan Serey	17,948	43.11	−1.40
Labor hold		Swing	+1.40	

2014 Victorian state election: Narre Warren South
Party	Candidate	Votes	%	±%
Labor	Judith Graley	19,501	48.2	−1.0
Liberal	Susan Serey	16,212	40.1	+2.5
Greens	Lynette Keleher	2,465	6.1	−0.8
Rise Up Australia	Anthony Sofe	1,278	3.2	+3.2
Christians	Narmien Andrawis	1,021	2.5	+2.5
Total formal votes		40,477	94.4	+0.3
Informal votes		2,414	5.6	−0.3
Turnout		42,891	93.6	+6.0
Two-party-preferred result
Labor	Judith Graley	22,461	55.5	−1.9
Liberal	Susan Serey	18,016	44.5	+1.9
Labor hold		Swing	−1.9	

2010 Victorian state election: Narre Warren South
Party	Candidate	Votes	%	±%
Labor	Judith Graley	22,007	47.95	−4.87
Liberal	Gary Rowe	17,402	37.92	+4.10
Greens	Claus Endres	3,244	7.07	+0.64
Family First	Mark Konkel	1,645	3.58	−3.36
Democratic Labor	Nathan Dodd	685	1.49	+1.49
Independent	Ian George	493	1.07	+1.07
Independent	Angela Dunleavy	416	0.91	+0.91
Total formal votes		45,892	93.67	−2.08
Informal votes		3,101	6.33	+2.08
Turnout		48,993	93.61	−0.60
Two-party-preferred result
Labor	Judith Graley	26,109	56.74	−4.20
Liberal	Gary Rowe	19,910	43.26	+4.20
Labor hold		Swing	−4.20	

=== Elections in the 2000s ===
2006 Victorian state election: Narre Warren South
Party	Candidate	Votes	%	±%
Labor	Judith Graley	21,853	52.8	−5.5
Liberal	Michael Shepherdson	13,993	33.8	−1.8
Family First	Bronwyn Rawlins	2,870	6.9	+6.9
Greens	Meg Tanti	2,659	6.4	+0.3
Total formal votes		41,375	95.7	−0.7
Informal votes		1,838	4.3	+0.7
Turnout		43,213	94.2	
Two-party-preferred result
Labor	Judith Graley	25,257	61.1	−1.5
Liberal	Michael Shepherdson	16,114	38.9	+1.5
Labor hold		Swing	−1.5	

2002 Victorian state election: Narre Warren South
Party	Candidate	Votes	%	±%
Labor	Dale Wilson	19,868	58.3	+10.2
Liberal	Michael Shepherdson	12,145	35.6	−15.4
Greens	Thom Lyons	2,066	6.1	+6.1
Total formal votes		34,079	96.5	−0.4
Informal votes		1,240	3.5	+0.4
Turnout		35,319	94.0	
Two-party-preferred result
Labor	Dale Wilson	21,318	62.6	+13.9
Liberal	Michael Shepherdson	12,758	37.4	−13.9
Labor gain from Liberal		Swing	+13.9	
