= Electoral results for the district of Hastings =

Election results for Hastings, Victoria, Australia

This is a list of electoral results for the Electoral district of Hastings in Victorian state elections.

== Members for Hastings ==
Member	Party	Term
Rosy Buchanan	Labor	2002–2006
Neale Burgess	Liberal	2006–2022
Paul Mercurio	Labor	2022–present

== Election results ==
=== Elections in the 2020s ===
2022 Victorian state election: Hastings
Party	Candidate	Votes	%	±%
Liberal	Briony Hutton	16,415	39.8	−5.0
Labor	Paul Mercurio	15,361	37.3	−1.4
Greens	Paul Saunders	4,118	10.0	−0.2
Animal Justice	Tyson Jack	1,736	4.2	−1.9
Freedom	Janet Felicity Benson	1,235	3.0	+3.0
Family First	Tom Sabo	1,001	2.4	+2.4
Democratic Labour	Camille De Wit	833	2.0	+2.0
Independent	Robert Whitehill	533	1.3	+1.3
Total formal votes		41,232	94.6	+0.2
Informal votes		2,369	5.4	−0.2
Turnout		43,601	89.6	+1.7
Two-party-preferred result
Labor	Paul Mercurio	21,174	51.4	+1.3
Liberal	Briony Hutton	20,058	48.6	−1.3
Labor notional gain from Liberal		Swing	+1.3	

=== Elections in the 2010s ===
2018 Victorian state election: Hastings
Party	Candidate	Votes	%	±%
Liberal	Neale Burgess	20,361	46.31	−4.89
Labor	Simon Meyer	16,916	38.47	+6.99
Greens	Nathan Lesslie	3,811	8.67	+1.23
Animal Justice	Georgia Knight	2,880	6.55	+6.55
Total formal votes		43,968	94.23	+0.13
Informal votes		2,691	5.77	−0.13
Turnout		46,659	90.80	−3.03
Two-party-preferred result
Liberal	Neale Burgess	22,452	51.06	−6.59
Labor	Simon Meyer	21,516	48.94	+6.59
Liberal hold		Swing	−6.59	

2014 Victorian state election: Hastings
Party	Candidate	Votes	%	±%
Liberal	Neale Burgess	21,316	51.2	−1.7
Labor	Steven Hosking	13,109	31.5	−0.7
Greens	Derek Fagan	3,096	7.4	+0.4
Independent	Robert Andersson	2,133	5.1	+5.1
Country Alliance	Scot Leslie	940	2.3	+0.8
Rise Up Australia	Colin Robertson	697	1.7	+1.7
Independent	Paul Madigan	343	0.8	+0.8
Total formal votes		41,634	94.1	−0.2
Informal votes		2,608	5.9	+0.2
Turnout		44,242	93.8	+1.9
Two-party-preferred result
Liberal	Neale Burgess	24,036	57.6	−2.0
Labor	Steven Hosking	17,657	42.4	+2.0
Liberal hold		Swing	−2.0	

2010 Victorian state election: Hastings
Party	Candidate	Votes	%	±%
Liberal	Neale Burgess	21,656	54.10	+9.58
Labor	Steve Hosking	12,262	30.63	−9.78
Greens	Catherine Manning	3,073	7.68	+0.66
Sex Party	Joe Mavrikos	994	2.48	+2.48
Family First	Melanie Marcin	775	1.94	−2.89
Country Alliance	Dan Martin	670	1.67	+1.67
Democratic Labor	Rob Jones	381	0.95	+0.95
Independent	Aldona Martin	218	0.54	+0.54
Total formal votes		40,029	94.44	−1.64
Informal votes		2,356	5.56	+1.64
Turnout		42,385	93.78	−0.59
Two-party-preferred result
Liberal	Neale Burgess	24,379	60.78	+9.79
Labor	Steve Hosking	15,728	39.22	−9.79
Liberal hold		Swing	+9.79	

=== Elections in the 2000s ===
2006 Victorian state election: Hastings
Party	Candidate	Votes	%	±%
Liberal	Neale Burgess	16,111	44.5	−1.6
Labor	Rosy Buchanan	14,625	40.4	−3.0
Greens	Francine Buckley	2,540	7.0	−2.3
Family First	Melanie Marcin	1,748	4.8	+4.8
National	Jim King	816	2.3	+2.3
People Power	Stuart Holm	351	1.0	+1.0
Total formal votes		36,191	96.1	−0.7
Informal votes		1,475	3.9	+0.7
Turnout		37,666	94.4	
Two-party-preferred result
Liberal	Neale Burgess	18,454	51.0	+1.9
Labor	Rosy Buchanan	17,737	49.0	−1.9
Liberal gain from Labor		Swing	+1.9	

2002 Victorian state election: Hastings
Party	Candidate	Votes	%	±%
Liberal	Neale Burgess	15,695	46.1	−8.7
Labor	Rosy Buchanan	14,790	43.4	+6.3
Greens	Willem Olivier	3,178	9.3	+9.2
Citizens Electoral Council	Henry Broadbent	397	1.2	+1.2
Total formal votes		34,060	96.8	−0.7
Informal votes		1,133	3.2	+0.7
Turnout		35,193	93.5	
Two-party-preferred result
Labor	Rosy Buchanan	17,321	50.9	+8.0
Liberal	Neale Burgess	16,739	49.1	−8.0
Labor gain from Liberal		Swing	+8.0	
