= Electoral results for the district of Wendouree =

Victoria, Australia, district election results

This is a list of electoral results for the Electoral district of Wendouree in Victorian state elections.

== Members for Wendouree ==
Member	Party	Term
Sharon Knight	Labor	2014–2018
Juliana Addison	Labor	2018–present

== Election results ==
=== Elections in the 2020s ===
2022 Victorian state election: Wendouree
Party	Candidate	Votes	%	±%
Labor	Juliana Addison	20,059	47.6	−3.1
Liberal	Samantha McIntosh	12,548	29.7	−4.1
Greens	Ellen Burns	4,386	10.4	+1.4
Family First	Ian Harkness	1,616	3.8	+3.8
Animal Justice	Bryn Hills	1,602	3.8	+0.2
Democratic Labour	Dianne Colbert	1,509	3.6	+3.6
Independent	Bren Eckel	455	1.1	+0.9
Total formal votes		42,175	95.2	+0.5
Informal votes		2,396	5.4	−0.5
Turnout		44,571	88.3	
Two-party-preferred result
Labor	Juliana Addison	26,846	63.5	+2.4
Liberal	Samantha McIntosh	15,457	36.5	−2.4
Labor hold		Swing	+2.4	

=== Elections in the 2010s ===
2018 Victorian state election: Wendouree
Party	Candidate	Votes	%	±%
Labor	Juliana Addison	18,616	49.39	+6.15
Liberal	Amy Johnson	13,270	35.21	−4.45
Greens	Alice Barnes	3,647	9.68	−0.31
Animal Justice	Bryn Hills	1,303	3.46	+3.46
Independent	Alison May Smith	473	1.25	+1.25
Victorian Socialists	Jeremy Smith	382	1.01	+1.01
Total formal votes		37,691	94.38	−0.75
Informal votes		2,246	5.62	+0.75
Turnout		39,937	91.65	−2.54
Two-party-preferred result
Labor	Juliana Addison	22,751	60.26	+4.47
Liberal	Amy Johnson	15,005	39.74	−4.47
Labor hold		Swing	+4.47	

2014 Victorian state election: Wendouree
Party	Candidate	Votes	%	±%
Labor	Sharon Knight	15,712	43.2	+3.1
Liberal	Craig Coltman	14,408	39.7	−5.1
Greens	Alice Barnes	3,629	10.0	−0.5
Sex Party	Liam Hastie	1,387	3.8	+3.8
Family First	Cielo Fenn	653	1.8	−1.3
Country Alliance	John Buchholz	343	0.9	−0.6
Rise Up Australia	Sheila O'Shea	201	0.6	+0.6
Total formal votes		36,333	95.1	+0.8
Informal votes		1,862	4.9	−0.8
Turnout		38,195	94.2	+0.9
Two-party-preferred result
Labor	Sharon Knight	20,270	55.8	+5.9
Liberal	Craig Coltman	16,063	44.2	−5.9
Labor gain from Liberal		Swing	+5.9	
