= Electoral results for the district of Sunbury =

Victoria, Australia, district election results

This is a list of electoral results for the Electoral district of Sunbury in Victorian state elections.

== Members for Sunbury ==
Member	Party	Term
Josh Bull	Labor	2014–present

== Election results ==
=== Elections in the 2020s ===
2022 Victorian state election: Sunbury
Party	Candidate	Votes	%	±%
Labor	Josh Bull	16,253	43.1	−15.5
Liberal	Simmone Cottom	11,895	31.6	−2.1
Greens	Richard Burke	2,459	6.5	−1.2
Animal Justice	Rohanna Mohr	1,537	4.1	+4.1
Family First	Charles Pace	1,445	3.8	+3.8
Independent	Laurence Pincini	1,432	3.8	+3.8
Democratic Labour	Peter Bayliss	1,317	3.5	+3.5
Victorian Socialists	James Gallagher	1,164	3.1	+3.1
New Democrats	Rushi Vijaykumar Patel	204	0.5	+0.5
Total formal votes		37,706	93.5	–0.5
Informal votes		2,620	6.5	+0.5
Turnout		40,326	88.5	
Two-party-preferred result
Labor	Josh Bull	21,271	56.4	−8.1
Liberal	Simmone Cottom	16,435	43.6	+8.1
Labor hold		Swing	−8.1	

=== Elections in the 2010s ===
2018 Victorian state election: Sunbury
Party	Candidate	Votes	%	±%
Labor	Josh Bull	22,749	58.40	+14.30
Liberal	Cassandra Marr	13,178	33.83	−2.26
Greens	Ryan Keable	3,028	7.77	−0.09
Total formal votes		38,955	94.02	−0.28
Informal votes		2,476	5.98	+0.28
Turnout		41,431	90.88	−3.04
Two-party-preferred result
Labor	Josh Bull	25,011	64.33	+10.03
Liberal	Cassandra Marr	13,868	35.67	−10.03
Labor hold		Swing	+10.03	

2014 Victorian state election: Sunbury
Party	Candidate	Votes	%	±%
Labor	Josh Bull	16,358	44.1	−1.8
Liberal	Jo Hagan	13,384	36.1	−1.6
Greens	Ella Webb	2,918	7.9	−0.4
Independent	Steve Medcraft	2,850	7.7	+7.7
Christians	Charles Williams	802	2.2	+2.2
Independent	Billy Lopez	395	1.1	+1.1
Voice for the West	Vern Hughes	384	1.0	+1.0
Total formal votes		37,091	94.3	+0.3
Informal votes		2,239	5.7	−0.3
Turnout		39,330	93.9	−3.0
Two-party-preferred result
Labor	Josh Bull	20,139	54.3	−2.2
Liberal	Jo Hagan	16,952	45.7	+2.2
Labor hold		Swing	−2.2	
