= Gary Rowe =

Australian politician

- Born: Gary James Rowe; 5 September 1952 (age 73); Coburg, Victoria
- Education: Victoria Police Academy
- Parent(s): Douglas James and Norma Lilian Rowe

Councillor in Shire of Cranbourne
- In office 1989–1992

Member of the Victorian Parliament for Cranbourne
- In office 1992–2002
- Preceded by: seat created
- Succeeded by: Jude Perera

Personal details
- Party: Independent
- Other political affiliations: Liberal Party

Councillor in City of Casey
- Incumbent
- Assumed office 2012–2016, 2017–2020, 2024–present

Gary James Rowe (born 5 September 1952) is an Australian politician. He was the Liberal member for Cranbourne in the Victorian Legislative Assembly from 1992 to 2002.

Rowe was born in Coburg, Victoria, to Douglas James and Norma Lilian Rowe. He attended Glen Waverley High School before studying at Victoria Police Academy, where he was one of the top ten graduates. In 1970 he became a police officer, but in 1974 became a consultant with National Mutual and in 1977 founded a finance and insurance company, of which he became director. He was also director of a number of other finance and insurance businesses. In 1989, he was elected to Cranbourne Shire Council, serving until 1992.

In 1992, Rowe was elected to the new seat of Cranbourne in the Victorian Legislative Assembly. Following the Kennett Government's defeat in 1999 he became Parliamentary Secretary to the Leader of the Opposition. He was defeated on 30 November 2002 by Labor candidate Jude Perera.

In 2012, Rowe was elected as a councillor for Mayfield Ward in the City of Casey. Councillor Rowe was not re-elected to Casey City Council in October 2016, but was subsequently re-elected at a countback for Mayfield Ward in April 2017 after Councillor Steve Beardon resigned. He was dismissed alongside the rest of Casey City Council in 2020, following a municipal monitor's report that found the council had overseen significant governance failures. Regardless, he was once again re-elected as a councillor for Casey in 2024 after successfully contesting Correa Ward.

Parliament of Victoria
Preceded by New seat	Member for Cranbourne; 1992–2002	Succeeded by Jude Perera
