= Denis Napthine =

Premier of Victoria from 2013 to 2014

The Honourable Denis Napthine AO
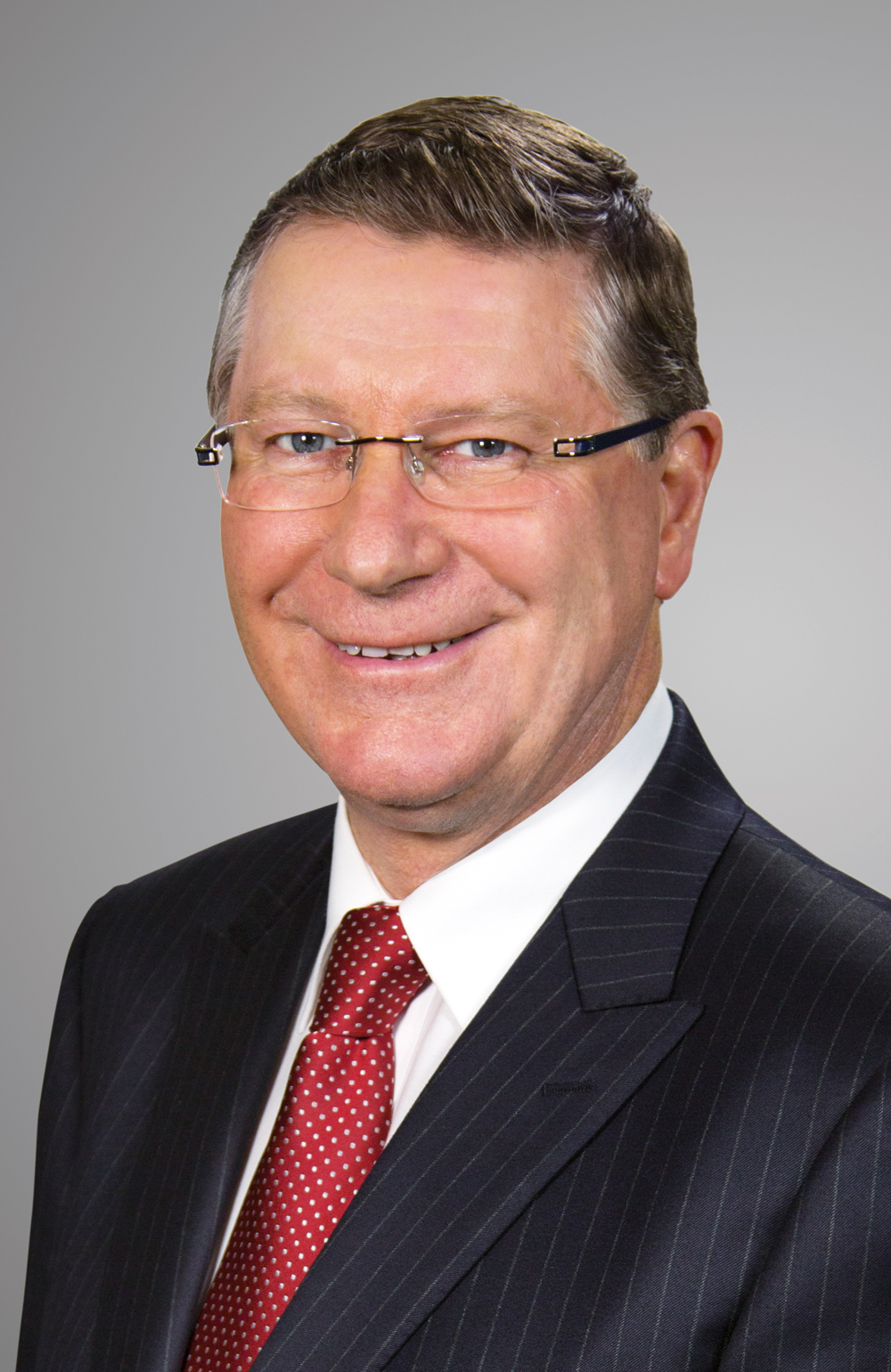
- Napthine in 2013

47th Premier of Victoria
- In office 6 March 2013 – 4 December 2014
- Monarch: Elizabeth II
- Governor: Alex Chernov
- Deputy: Peter Ryan
- Preceded by: Ted Baillieu
- Succeeded by: Daniel Andrews

Leader of the Opposition of Victoria
- In office 26 October 1999 – 20 August 2002
- Premier: Steve Bracks
- Deputy: Louise Asher
- Preceded by: Jeff Kennett
- Succeeded by: Robert Doyle

Leader of the Liberal Party in Victoria
- In office 6 March 2013 – 4 December 2014
- Deputy: Louise Asher
- Preceded by: Ted Baillieu
- Succeeded by: Matthew Guy
- In office 26 October 1999 – 20 August 2002
- Deputy: Louise Asher
- Preceded by: Jeff Kennett
- Succeeded by: Robert Doyle

Minister for Regional Cities and Racing
- In office 13 March 2013 – 4 December 2014
- Premier: Himself
- Succeeded by: Martin Pakula (Racing)

Minister for the Arts
- In office 6 March 2013 – 13 March 2013
- Premier: Himself
- Preceded by: Ted Baillieu
- Succeeded by: Heidi Victoria

Minister for Ports, Regional Cities, Racing and Major Projects
- In office 2 December 2010 – 13 March 2013
- Premier: Ted Baillieu; Himself
- Preceded by: Tim Pallas (Ports, Major Projects); Rob Hulls (Racing)
- Succeeded by: David Hodgett (Ports, Major Projects)

Treasurer of Victoria
- In office 7 October 1999 – 20 October 1999
- Premier: Jeff Kennett
- Preceded by: Alan Stockdale
- Succeeded by: Steve Bracks

Minister for Youth and Community Services
- In office 30 March 1996 – 18 September 1999
- Premier: Jeff Kennett
- Preceded by: Vin Heffernan (Youth); Michael John (Community)
- Succeeded by: Jacinta Allan (Youth); Christine Campbell (Community)

Member of Parliament for South-West Coast
- In office 30 November 2002 – 3 September 2015
- Preceded by: New seat
- Succeeded by: Roma Britnell

Member of the Victorian Parliament for Portland
- In office 1 October 1988 – 30 November 2002
- Preceded by: Digby Crozier
- Succeeded by: Seat abolished

Personal details
- Born: Denis Vincent Napthine; 6 March 1952 (age 74) Geelong, Victoria, Australia
- Party: Liberal
- Spouse: Peggy
- Education: University of Melbourne; Deakin University
- Profession: Veterinarian
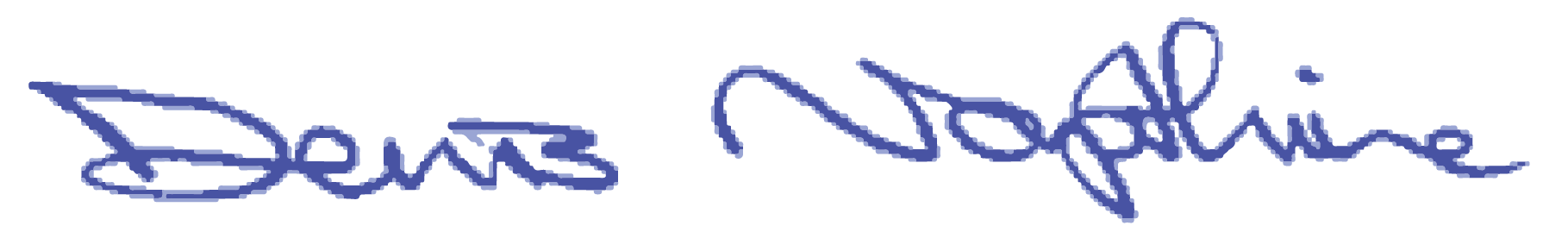
- Signature
- Website: denisnapthine.com.au

Denis Vincent Napthine AO (born 6 March 1952) is an Australian former politician and veterinarian who served as the 47th premier of Victoria from 2013 to 2014 and the leader of the Victorian Liberal Party from 1999 to 2002, and again from 2013 to 2014. He was the member of the Legislative Assembly (MP) for the district of Portland from 1988 to 2002, and that of South-West Coast from 2002 to 2015.

He was elected leader of the Parliamentary Liberal Party on 6 March 2013 following the resignation of Ted Baillieu and was sworn in as premier on the same day. His party lost the Victorian state election on 29 November 2014 and he announced he would step down as leader of the Parliamentary Liberal Party, with Matthew Guy being elected his successor on 4 December.

As of 2026, he is the most recent Liberal Premier of Victoria.

== Early life ==
Napthine was born in 1952 to Len and Theresa Napthine in Geelong, Victoria, as the third child in a family of ten children.

Napthine spent his early school years at Winchelsea State School before attending Chanel College, a Catholic boys' school in Lovely Banks near Geelong. After graduating he attended the University of Melbourne, where he studied to be a veterinarian, undertaking a bachelor's and then a master's degree in veterinary science. He later completed a master's degree in business administration from Deakin University.

== Political career ==
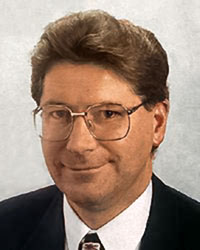
Napthine earlier in his political career

Napthine was elected to the Victorian Legislative Assembly in 1988 as member for the country seat of Portland. He was re-elected in 1992, 1996 and 1999.

Napthine was appointed Parliamentary Secretary to the Minister for Health in 1992 and then promoted to Minister for Youth and Community Services in 1996 in Jeff Kennett's Liberal government, a position he held from 1996 to 1999.

Following the defeat of the Liberal Party at the 1999 election, Kennett resigned as Liberal leader and Napthine was elected to take his place. Napthine had briefly served as Deputy Liberal Leader, having been elected to the position just shortly before Kennett stood down as Liberal Leader. During his term as Opposition Leader the Liberal–National coalition split, fracturing the opposition parties.

Under Napthine's leadership, the Liberal Party did poorly in the polls and made no significant electoral inroads on the ruling Labor government. Shortly before the 2002 state election, Shadow Health Minister Robert Doyle challenged Napthine for the leadership of the Liberal Party. Doyle won the leadership by a narrow margin. At this election, Napthine ran in South-West Coast, essentially a reconfigured version of Portland. Although it was ancestrally Liberal territory, Napthine only managed to hold onto the seat with a significantly reduced margin which fell from 4.9 to only 0.7 points. He was re-elected in November 2006 with an increased margin.

After the Liberals won the 2010 Victorian election, Napthine was made a member of the Baillieu cabinet. He served as the Minister for Ports, Racing, Regional Cities and Major Projects.

=== Premier of Victoria ===
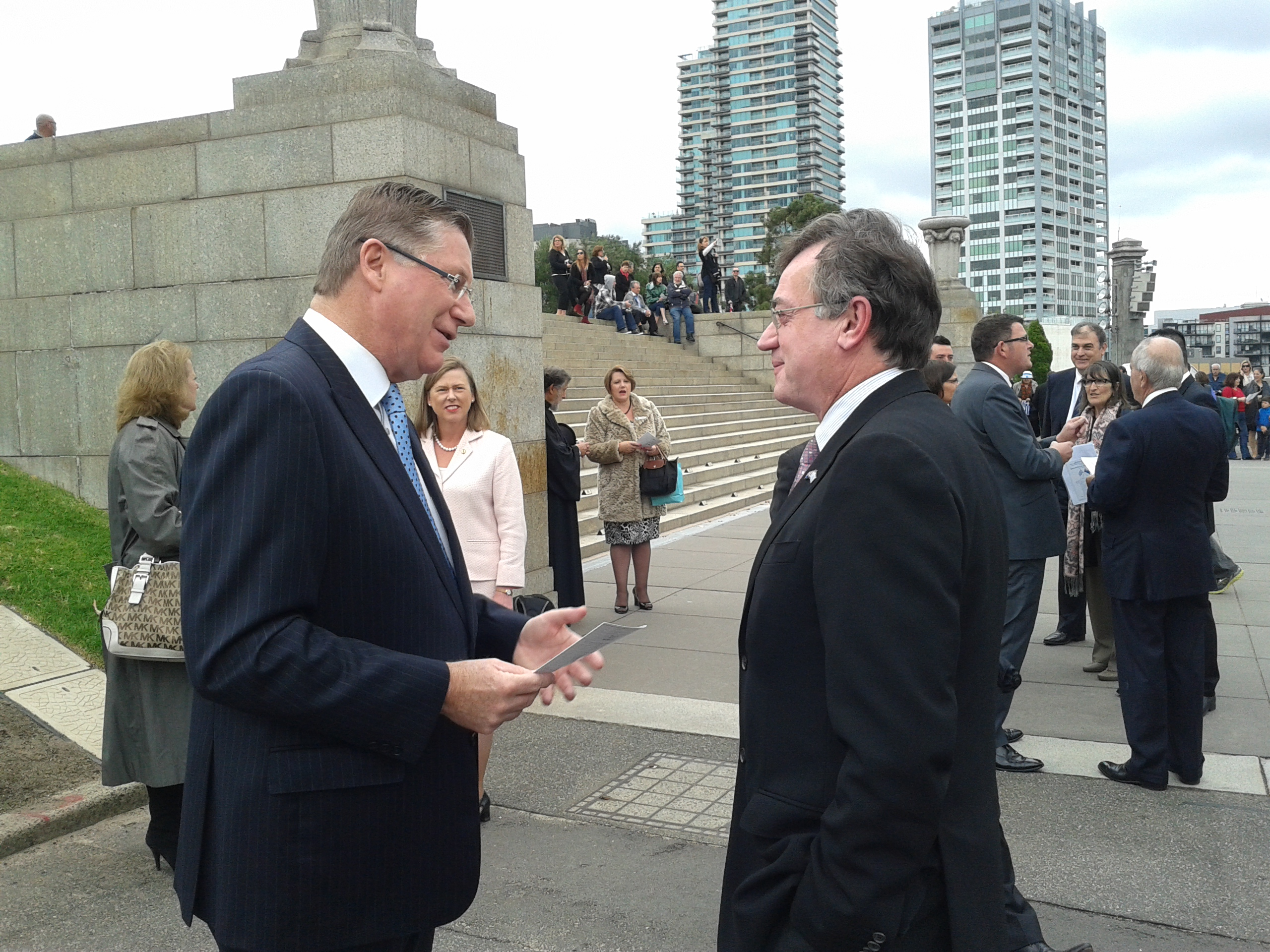
Napthine (left) in 2014

On 6 March 2013, Baillieu resigned as state leader of the Liberal Party and hence as Premier of Victoria. At an emergency meeting of the Liberal partyroom, Napthine—who had turned 61 that day—was elected his successor. After the resignation of Geoff Shaw from the parliamentary Liberal Party earlier in the day, Napthine began leadership of a minority government, holding 43 seats (44 seats including that of the Speaker) to Labor's 43 seats, with Shaw sitting as an independent politician on the crossbench.

On 28 November 2013 Australian media reported that Napthine had 'secretly assisted' Shaw to draft a Private Member's Bill to change state abortion legislation which Napthine voted against in 2008. Napthine refuted the allegations and stated his Government had no plans to change abortion laws, nor would he support any such change. In June 2014 Napthine stated:

"...that while I am Premier of this state, I will not allow Mr Shaw to introduce any legislation seeking to change the abortion laws in Victoria."

During September 2014 Napthine and Daniel Andrews told the Australian Christian Lobby that they would allow a conscience vote should a private members bill to repeal section eight of the Victorian abortion laws be introduced. Section eight if removed would mean doctors are not required by law to refer a woman who wants an abortion to an abortion doctor or perform the abortion even if they have a conscientious objection.

In May 2014 a parliamentary privileges committee found that Shaw was not diligent in the use of his parliamentary car and fuel card. On 3 June 2014 Shaw told radio station 774 ABC Melbourne that he would support a no confidence motion in the Napthine government. On 11 June 2014, following a Labor move to expel Shaw from Parliament that was defeated on party lines with the support of the speaker, Napthine's government successfully moved a motion that resulted in the Members of the Legislative Assembly suspending Shaw for a period of eleven days, fined A$6,838 and ordered to apologise to the Parliament upon his return. Shaw's suspension followed a period of political instability under Napthine's leadership.

On 29 September 2014, Napthine along with former Minister for Public Transport and Roads Terry Mulder signed what was reported to be a $5.3 billion contract with the now defunct East West Connect consortium to build the controversial East West Link toll road. He has since received a lot of criticism for this, not only for his decision to sign on the eve of the month-long caretaker period before the upcoming November 2014 state election and before two legal cases into the planning approval for the project were resolved, but also for his decision, at the insistence of the East West Connect consortium, to direct the then state treasurer Michael O'Brien to sign a "side letter" guaranteeing the consortium compensation of more than $1 billion in the event that the court cases were successful or if for some other reason the contracts were cancelled (which Labor promised to do if it won the election), which was thought to be a contributing factor in the state having to pay what is thought to amount to $1.1 billion to EWC upon the declaration by the then new Andrews government to suspend work in December 2014, and the contracts eventually being terminated in June 2015. It was also revealed upon the contracts termination and release that the real cost of the Eastern section of East West Link amounted to $10.7 billion, $3.9 billion more than the $6.8 billion estimated cost by the Napthine government. In December 2015, the Victorian Auditor General revealed the cost of both sections of the East West Link would have been close to $22.8 billion in nominal terms.

=== In opposition ===
On 29 November 2014, after the Victorian state election, Napthine conceded defeat to Labor led by Daniel Andrews.

Napthine stated that he intended to serve a full parliamentary term despite losing the Premiership, however on 31 August 2015 he announced his resignation from the Victorian Parliament, which triggered a by-election in his electorate of South-West Coast.

== Personal life ==
Napthine and his wife Peggy have three children. His younger brother, Simon, was the unsuccessful ALP candidate for the federal seat of Flinders at the 2004 election.

Since childhood, Napthine has supported the Geelong Football Club in the Australian Football League.

One of Napthine's ancestors was convict Joseph Potaski.

== See also ==
- 2014 Victorian state election

Victorian Legislative Assembly
Preceded by Digby Crozier	Member for Portland; 1988–2002	Seat abolished
Seat created	Member for South-West Coast; 2002–2015	Succeeded by Roma Britnell
Political offices
Preceded by Vin Heffernan as Minister for Youth Affairs	Minister for Youth and Community Services; 1996–1999	Succeeded by Jacinta Allan as Minister for Education Services and Youth Affairs
Preceded by Michael John as Minister for Community Services	Minister for Youth and Community Services; 1996–1999	Succeeded by Christine Campbell as Minister for Community Development
Preceded by Alan Stockdale	Treasurer of Victoria; 1999	Succeeded by Steve Bracks
Preceded by Steve Bracks	Leader of the Opposition of Victoria; 1999–2002	Succeeded by Robert Doyle
Preceded by Tim Pallas as Minister for Roads and Ports	Minister for Ports; 2010–2014	Succeeded by Luke Donnellan
Preceded by Tim Pallas as Minister for Roads and Ports	Minister for Major Projects; 2010–2014	Ministry abolished
Preceded by Rob Hulls	Minister for Racing; 2010–2014	Succeeded by Martin Pakula
Preceded by Jacinta Allan as Minister for Regional and Rural Development	Minister for Regional Cities; 2010–2014	Succeeded by Jaala Pulford as Minister for Regional Development
Preceded by Ted Baillieu	Minister for the Arts; 2013	Succeeded by Heidi Victoria
Preceded by Ted Baillieu	Premier of Victoria; 2013–2014	Succeeded by Daniel Andrews
Party political offices
Preceded by Jeff Kennett	Leader of the Liberal Party in Victoria; 1999–2002	Succeeded by Robert Doyle
Preceded by Ted Baillieu	Leader of the Liberal Party in Victoria; 2013–2014	Succeeded by Matthew Guy
