= Rosy Buchanan =

Australian politician

Rosalyn Buchanan (born 8 November 1961) is an Australian politician. She was a Labor Party member of the Victorian Legislative Assembly from 2002 to 2006, representing the electorate of Hastings.

Buchanan was born in Bairnsdale and was educated at Footscray Technical College. She was a volunteer support worker and support group co-ordinator before becoming a manager with Centrelink from 1989 to 2002. She was also a Shire of Hastings councillor from 1989 to 1992.

Buchanan was elected to the Victorian Legislative Assembly in a shock upset in the Bracks government's landslide victory at the 2002 state election. She unexpectedly won the new seat of Hastings, which had been viewed as a safe seat for the conservative Liberal Party of Australia, and had a notional Liberal margin of over 8%. Buchanan initially only received $100 in campaign funding from the Labor Party until Joan Kirner and EMILY's List Australia stepped in and provided $1500 to fund leaflets and signs. She was to only serve one term, as Neale Burgess, the defeated Liberal candidate from 2002, recontested the seat at the 2006 election and defeated Buchanan by 717 votes.

Victorian Legislative Assembly
Preceded by New district	Member for Hastings; 2002–2006	Succeeded by Neale Burgess
