= Dale Wilson (politician) =

Australian politician

Dale Lester Wilson (born 7 June 1953) is an Australian politician, and a former member of the Victorian Legislative Assembly for Narre Warren South. He was elected in 2002. He is a member of the Labor Party and a member of its Socialist Left faction.

In March 2006, Wilson was opposed and defeated by Judith Graley in a pre-selection ballot for ALP endorsement. She was supported by the Labor Right. After his defeat in the preselection contest, Wilson blamed Police Minister Tim Holding for his defeat.

Victorian Legislative Assembly
Preceded by New District	Member for Narre Warren South; 2002–2006	Succeeded by Judith Graley
