= 2015 South-West Coast state by-election =

- 31 October 2015

Electoral district of South-West Coast in the Victorian Legislative Assembly
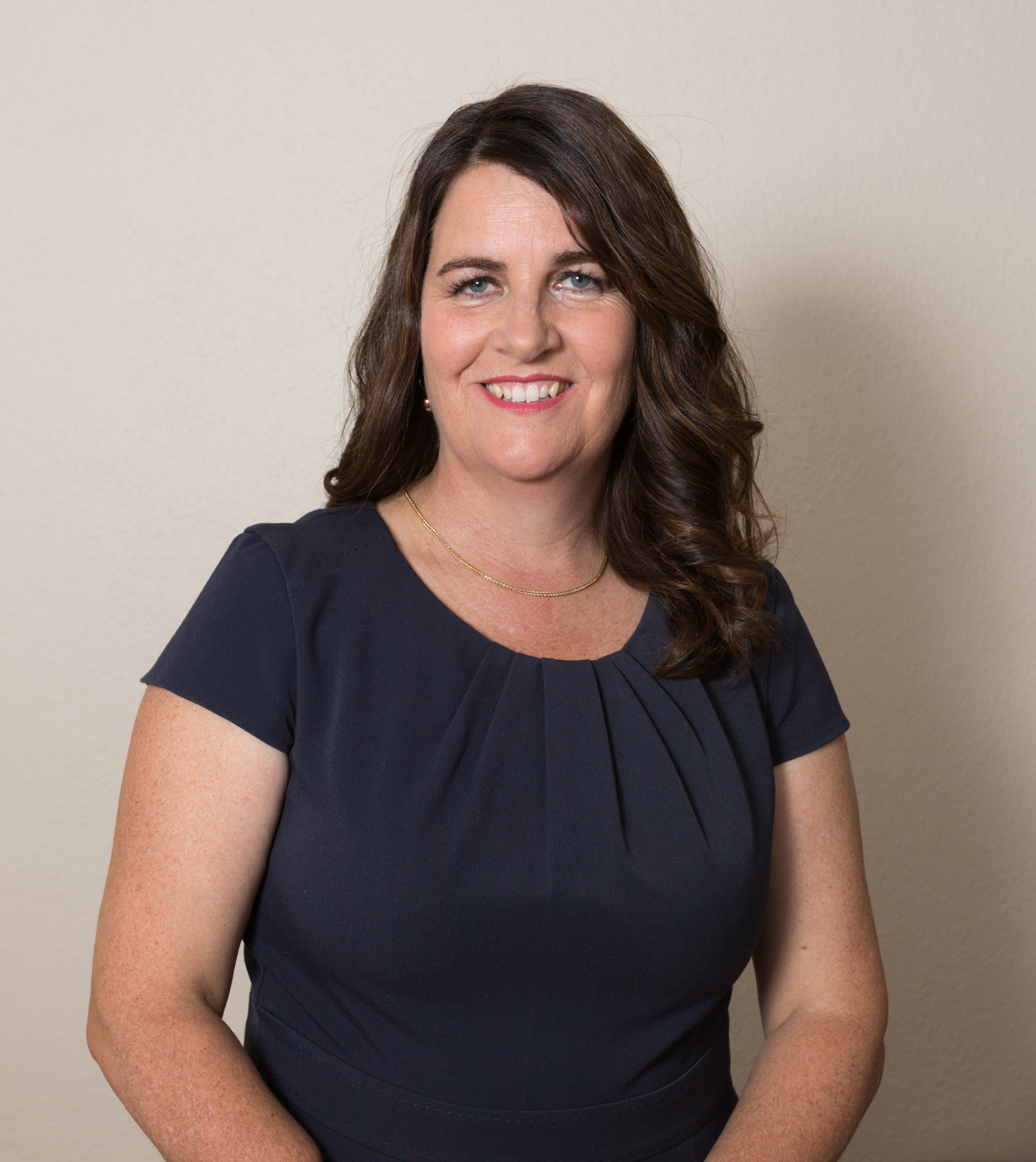

	First party	Second party
		IND
Candidate	Roma Britnell	Roy Reekie
Party	Liberal	Independent
Primary vote	15,486	6,512
Percentage	40.0%	16.8%
Swing	▼17.0pp	▲16.8pp
TPP	60.6%	39.4%
TPP swing	▼0.4pp	▲39.4pp
	Third party	Fourth party
		ACP
Candidate	Michael Neoh	Jim Doukas
Party	National	Country
Primary vote	5,581	4,005
Percentage	14.4%	10.3%
Swing	▲14.4pp	▲8.0pp
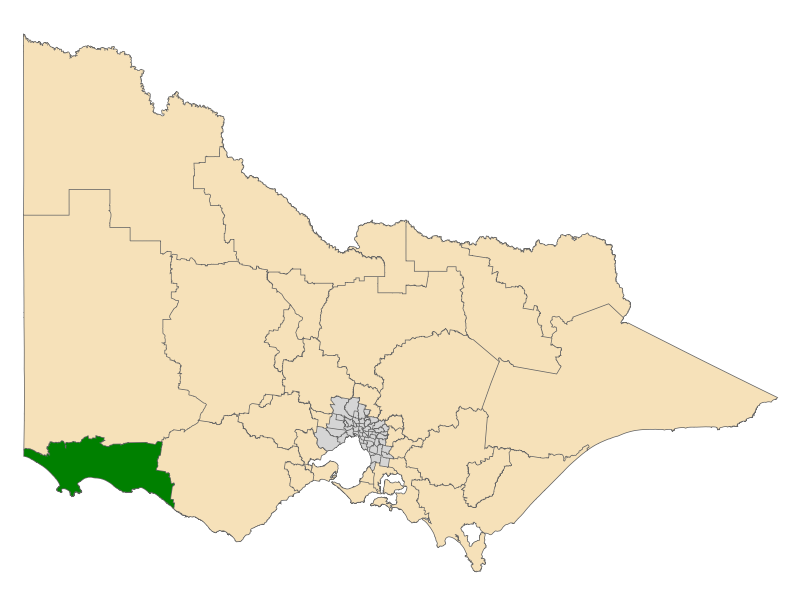
- The electoral district of South-West Coast in south-west rural Victoria is dominated by the town of Warrnambool, but also includes Portland, Port Fairy, Koroit, Heywood and Macarthur.
MP before election
Denis Napthine
Liberal
Elected MP
Roma Britnell
Liberal

A by-election for the seat of South-West Coast in the Victorian Legislative Assembly was held on 31 October 2015. The by-election was triggered by the resignation of former Premier Denis Napthine on 3 September 2015. Former Transport Minister Terry Mulder resigned his seat representing the adjacent district of Polwarth on the same day as Napthine. The by-election for Polwarth was held on the same day.

== Candidates ==
11 candidates in ballot paper order
Party	Candidate	Background
Independent	Rodney Van De Hoef	Warrnambool engineer.
Liberal	Roma Britnell	Dairy farmer. Vice President of the United Dairyfarmers of Victoria.
Independent	Roy Reekie	Labor candidate for Warrnambool in 1999 and South-West Coast in 2002, 2006 and 2014. Narrowly lost 2002 on a 49.3 percent two-party vote.
Country	Jim Doukas	Shire of Moyne councillor.
National	Michael Neoh	Mayor of Warrnambool.
Independent	Pete Smith	Independent Liberal. Dairy industry executive, advisor to BlueScope Steel, AWB and Australia Post, army press officer, naval officer.
Greens	Thomas Campbell	Greens candidate for South-West Coast in 2014.
Independent	Swampy Marsh	Warrnambool dairy and chicken farmer. Subject of the 2015 film Oddball.
Animal Justice	Jennifer Gamble	Warrnambool nurse. Animal Justice candidate for Western Victoria Region in 2014.
Christians	Lillian Len	
Independent	Michael McCluskey	Former veterinarian. Independent candidate for South-West Coast in 2014.

The Labor government did not contest the by-elections in the safe Liberal seats of South-West Coast and Polwarth.

== How-to-vote cards ==
How-to-vote cards are distributed to voters at polling stations to provide information with how the candidate suggests preferences be allocated. Candidates and parties suggesting preferences are shown in each column of the table below. Michael McCluskey ran an open card at this by-election.

	Van De Hoef	Liberal	Reekie	Country	National	Smith	Greens	Marsh	AJP	Christians	McCluskey
Van de Hoef	1	11	10	4	4	No card	7	9	7	5	
Liberal	11	1	11	9	2	No card	8	11	10	3	
Reekie	2	6	1	7	3	No card	2	6	3	9	
Country	3	3	4	1	5	No card	11	2	9	2	
National	4	2	5	10	1	No card	9	10	11	4	
Smith	5	5	3	6	6	No card	5	4	5	7	
Greens	6	8	2	11	7	No card	1	8	2	11	
Marsh	7	10	6	2	8	No card	6	1	4	8	
Animal Justice	8	7	7	8	9	No card	4	5	1	10	
Christians	9	4	8	3	10	No card	10	7	8	1	
McCluskey	10	9	9	5	11	No card	3	8	6	6	1

== Polling ==
South-West Coast polling
Date	Primary vote
	LIB	Reekie	NAT	OTH
23 October 2015	37%	24%	18%	21%

== Result ==
2015 South-West Coast state by-election
Party	Candidate	Votes	%	±%
Liberal	Roma Britnell	15,486	40.0	−17.0
Independent	Roy Reekie	6,512	16.8	+16.8
National	Michael Neoh	5,581	14.4	+14.4
Country	Jim Doukas	4,005	10.3	+8.0
Greens	Thomas Campbell	2,938	7.6	−2.2
Independent	Swampy Marsh	1,137	2.9	+2.9
Independent Liberal	Pete Smith	695	1.8	+1.8
Independent	Rodney Van de Hoef	677	1.7	+1.7
Independent	Michael McCluskey	616	1.6	−0.0
Christians	Lillian Len	579	1.5	+1.5
Animal Justice	Jennifer Gamble	490	1.3	+1.3
Total formal votes		38,716	93.8	−2.2
Informal votes		2,578	6.2	+2.2
Turnout		41,294	91.1	−3.8
Two-candidate-preferred result
Liberal	Roma Britnell	23,455	60.6	−0.4
Independent	Roy Reekie	15,261	39.4	+39.4
Liberal hold		Swing	−0.4	

Roma Britnell retained the seat on preferences for the Liberals. Roy Reekie was second in the primary count.

== See also ==
- 2015 Polwarth state by-election
- List of Victorian state by-elections
