= Jude Perera =

Australian politician (1953–2024)

Member of the Victorian Legislative Assembly for Cranbourne
- In office 25 November 2002 – 24 November 2018
- Preceded by: Gary Rowe
- Succeeded by: Pauline Richards

Personal details
- Born: 27 May 1953 Ceylon
- Died: 23 July 2024 (aged 71) Australia
- Party: Labor Party
- Education: University of Jaffna
- Occupation: Market researcher

Jude Perera (27 May 1953 – 23 July 2024) was an Australian politician who served as a member of the Victorian Legislative Assembly from 2002 to 2018, representing the seat of Cranbourne for the Labor Party. Perera was born in Sri Lanka, and received a Bachelor of Science from the University of Jaffna. He became a market researcher and held information technology positions in Sri Lanka, New Zealand and Australia.

Perera was elected to the Victorian Parliament in 2002 and served on the Scrutiny of Acts and Regulations Committee from 2003 to 2006 and as chair of the Family and Community Development Committee from 2007 to 2010. He also served as the Shadow Parliamentary Secretary for Multicultural Affairs from 1 February 2012 - 30 April 2014.

Perera died on 23 July 2024, at the age of 71.

Victorian Legislative Assembly
Preceded by Gary Rowe	Member for Cranbourne; 2002–2018	Succeeded by Pauline Richards
