= Judith Graley =

Australian politician

Member of the Victorian Legislative Assembly for Narre Warren South
- In office 25 November 2006 – 24 November 2018
- Preceded by: Dale Wilson
- Succeeded by: Gary Maas

Personal details
- Born: 26 January 1957 (age 69) Sunshine, Victoria
- Party: Labor Party

Judith Ann Graley (born 26 January 1957) is an Australian politician.

Graley was born in Sunshine, Victoria, and graduated from Sunshine West High School in 1974. She attended La Trobe University from 1975 to 1978, receiving a BA (Hons), and went on to receive a Diploma of Education from the University of Melbourne in 1979. In 1980 she returned to La Trobe University as a tutor in the Department of Politics, and the following year became a secondary teacher at Footscray.

Judith Graley served as a local government councillor for the Mornington Peninsula Shire Council from 1997 to 2003 and was its mayor from 2000 to 2001.

She was a tutor at the University of Melbourne from 1995 to 2000, and in 2002 became electorate officer to Labor MP Alistair Harkness; she worked for Tim Holding from February 2004 to October 2006.

In 2006, Graley was elected to the Victorian Legislative Assembly as the Labor member for Narre Warren South, having defeated sitting member Dale Wilson for preselection. Graley had been supported by the Labor Right faction. She did not seek re-election at the 2018 state election and retired in October 2018.

Victorian Legislative Assembly
Preceded by Dale Wilson	Member for Narre Warren South; 2006–2018	Succeeded by Gary Maas
