= Sharon Knight (politician) =

Australian politician

Member of the Victorian Legislative Assembly for Wendouree
- In office 29 November 2014 – 24 November 2018
- Preceded by: New seat
- Succeeded by: Juliana Addison

Member of the Victorian Legislative Assembly for Ballarat West
- In office 27 November 2010 – 29 November 2014
- Preceded by: Karen Overington
- Succeeded by: Seat abolished

Personal details
- Born: 27 January 1965 (age 61) East Melbourne, Victoria
- Party: Labor
- Education: Deakin University, University of Ballarat
- Website: http://www.sharonknight.com.au/

Sharon Patricia Knight (born 27 January 1965) is an Australian politician. She was a member of the Victorian Legislative Assembly from 2010 to 2018, representing Ballarat West until 2014 and Wendouree thereafter.

Victorian Legislative Assembly
Preceded by Karen Overington	Member for Ballarat West; 2010–2014	Abolished
New seat	Member for Wendouree; 2014–2018	Succeeded by Juliana Addison
