= Gary Maas =

Australian politician

Gary Maas MP
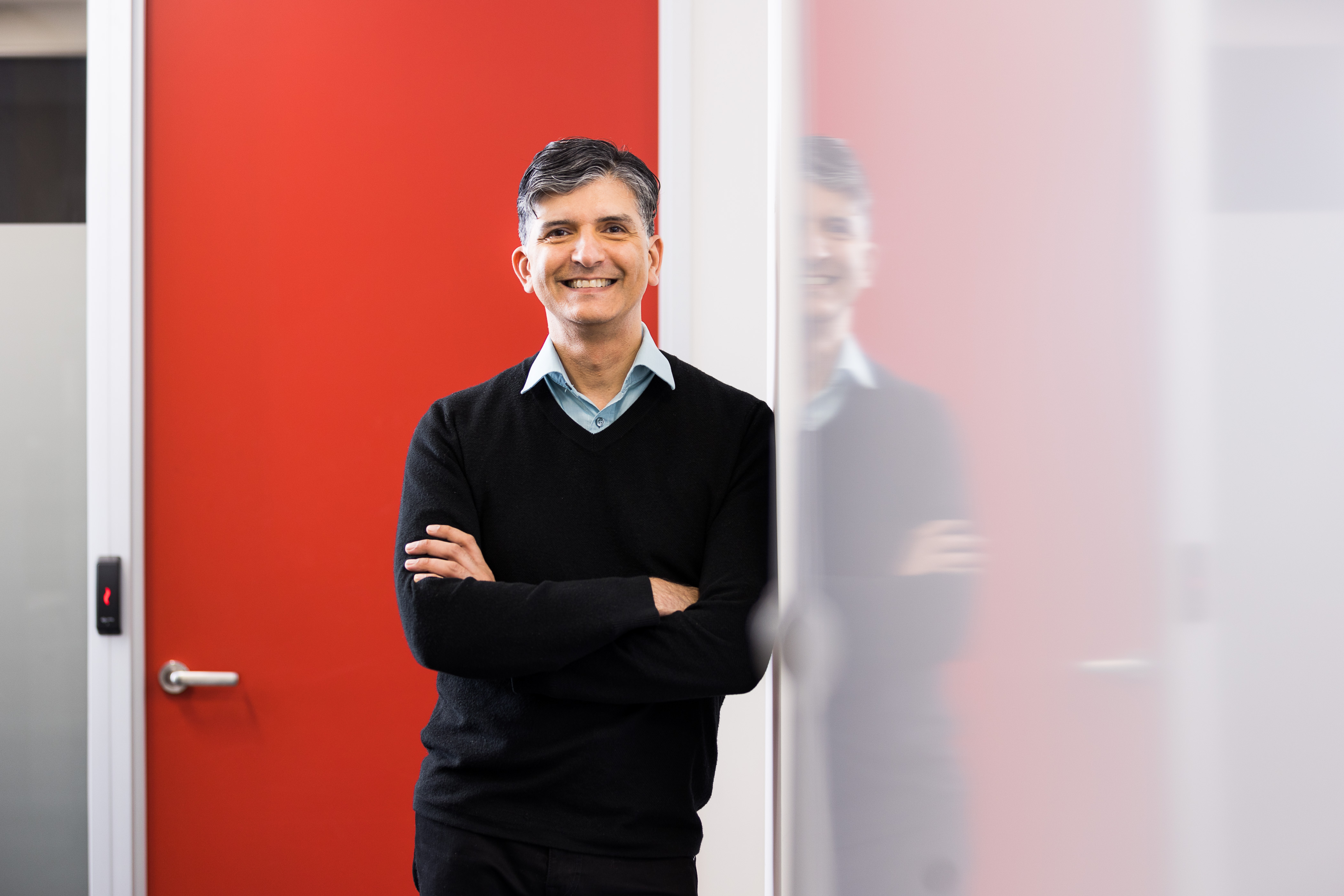

Member of the Victorian Legislative Assembly for Narre Warren South
- Incumbent
- Assumed office 24 November 2018
- Preceded by: Judith Graley

Personal details
- Party: Labor Party
- Committees: Chair, Scrutiny of Acts and Regulations Committee since August 2023 Member, Legislative Assembly Legal and Social Issues Committee March 2023 - February 2024 Chair, Integrity and Oversight Committee February 2023 - March 2023 Chair, Integrity and Oversight Committee August 2022 - November 2022 Member, Public Accounts and Estimates Committee March 2019 - November 2022
- Website: www.garymaas.org.au

Mark Gary Maas is an Australian politician. He has been a Labor Party member of the Victorian Legislative Assembly since November 2018, where he represents the seat of Narre Warren South. He has been a member of the party since 1998.

== Background and Early Career ==
Maas holds a Bachelor of Arts (B.A Honours) from Monash University and a Bachelor of Laws (LL.B) from La Trobe University. He also holds a Diploma in Financial Planning (Superannuation) and is a Graduate of the Australian Institute of Company Directors.

Maas has previously worked as a touring and recording musician, an educator and private-practice lawyer. He has been a director on commercial and not-for profit boards.

For 16 years, Maas worked at the powerful, private sector union - the National Union of Workers (now United Workers Union) - as an organiser, industrial lawyer and then assistant secretary. In his last four years he was its Victorian Secretary.

== Political career ==
In the November 2018 election, Maas was elected to represent Narre Warren South with a swing in his favour, successfully retaining the seat for Labor.

In November 2022 he was re-elected in a third term Andrews Labor Government, with a small swing against him and a primary vote of 48%.

Maas has an interest in many public policy areas including education, law reform, climate action, industrial relations, trade, housing and creative industries.

In 2023, Maas made a submission to the Electoral Matters Committee on the Conduct of the 2022 Victorian State Election highlighting his experience and recommendations, including concerns for his safety and the behaviour of some political activists during the two-week pre-poll period.

Since becoming the Member for Narre Warren South, Maas lived in the electorate but has since relocated to be closer to his children. In 2024, The Australian named Maas in an article about Members who live outside the district they represent.

He has been Chair of the Parliament of Victoria's Integrity and Oversight Committee and is the current chair of its Scrutiny of Acts and Regulations Committee.

On 5 June 2026, Maas announced that he would not recontest the seat of Narre Warren South at the 2026 Victorian state election.

== Personal life ==
Maas was born, raised and public school educated in the Melbourne south-eastern suburb of Springvale. He is the youngest son of Sri-Lankan migrants, who settled in Australia 18 months earlier.

He co-parents his two daughters from a previous marriage and is an active member of local music and creative communities.

Parliament of Victoria
Preceded by Judith Graley	Member for Narre Warren South; 2018–present	Incumbent
