= Neale Burgess =

Australian politician

Neale Burgess MP

Member of the Victorian Legislative Assembly for Hastings
- In office 25 November 2006 – 26 November 2022
- Preceded by: Rosy Buchanan
- Succeeded by: Paul Mercurio

Personal details
- Born: 17 August 1956 (age 69) Melbourne
- Party: Liberal Party
- Profession: Barrister, technology consultant
- Website: nealeburgess.com.au/

Neale Ronald Burgess (born 17 August 1956) is an Australian politician. He was a Liberal Party member of the Victorian Legislative Assembly from 2006 to 2022, representing the electorate of Hastings.

== Political career ==
Burgess first ran as the Liberal Party candidate for Hastings in the 2002 Victorian state election but lost the seat in the Labor ‘Brackslide’ to Labor’s Rosy Buchanan. Burgess ran again for the Liberals at the 2006 state election, and succeeded in winning back the traditionally conservative district for the Liberal Party. He later held the seat at the 2010, 2014 and 2018 state elections.

Burgess voted against the Abortion Law Reform Bill 2008, and later voted for banning anti-abortion protesters from protesting outside abortion clinics. In May 2018, he revealed he had changed his mind on the issue and now opposed buffer zones.

In June 2022, Burgess received a parliamentary suspension following several allegations of inappropriate behaviour beginning in November 2021. Burgess strongly denies the allegations.

In November 2021, Burgess announced he would not recontest Hastings at the 2022 state election, and was succeeded by Labor's Paul Mercurio.

== Personal life ==
Burgess was born in Melbourne and grew up in Tocumwal. He is the father of three children. In 1994, Burgess completed a Bachelor of Laws (with Honours) at the Queensland University of Technology, and was later admitted to the Bar. He worked for a number of years as a criminal law barrister. He operated a technology consulting business before entering politics.

Victorian Legislative Assembly
Preceded by Rosy Buchanan	Member for Hastings; 2006–2022	Succeeded by Paul Mercurio
