= Josh Bull =

Australian politician

Josh Bull MP
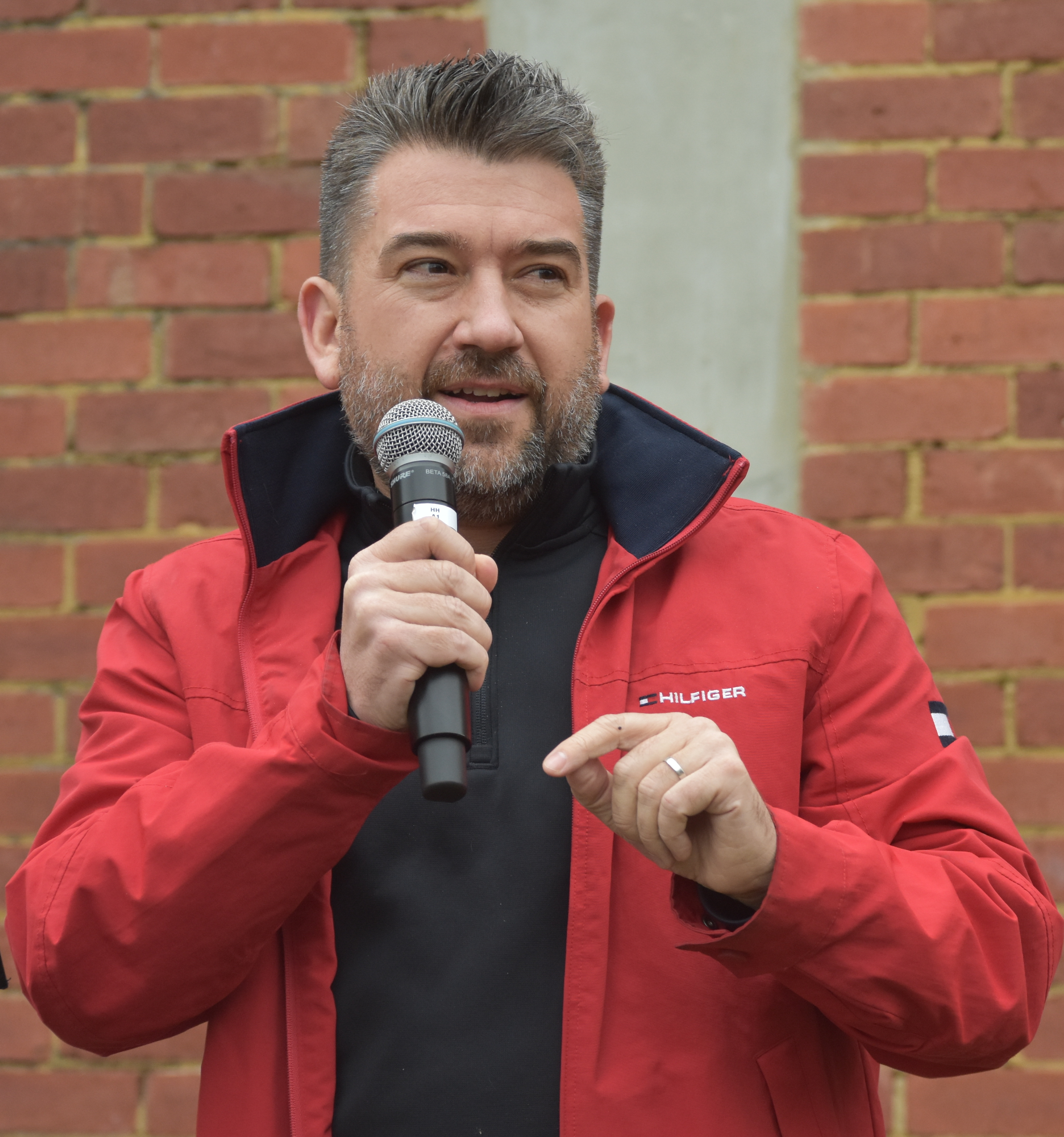
- Bull in 2026

Member of the Victorian Legislative Assembly for Sunbury
- Incumbent
- Assumed office 29 November 2014
- Preceded by: New seat

Personal details
- Born: 4 April 1985 (age 41) Sunbury, Victoria, Australia
- Party: Labor Party
- Education: Deakin University
- Occupation: Teacher
- Website: www.joshbull.com.au

Joshua Michael Bull (born 4 April 1985) is an Australian politician. He has been a Labor Party member of the Victorian Legislative Assembly since November 2014, representing the seat of Sunbury.

== Early life and education ==
Bull was born in 1985, in Sunbury, Victoria. He attended Sunbury Heights Primary, and graduated from Sunbury College in 2002, having been school captain. He went on to study at Deakin University from 2004 to 2007, undertaking a double degree in education and science.

After completing his degree, Bull became a teacher.

== Political career ==
Bull began his political career as an electorate officer for the former MP for Yuroke, Liz Beattie. He has also been chief of staff to the federal member for McEwen, Rob Mitchell. Bull has been actively involved with the ALP since 2003, serving as the Craigieburn Branch secretary for six years, a state conference delegate for three years, and a member of the Education and Youth Affairs Policy Committee and the Sport, Culture and Tourism Policy Committee.

In 2013, Bull was accepted into the Australian Defence Force as an Army Reserve officer cadet, though he has been on leave due to work commitments. He is a keen runner with Melbourne running club "The Crosbie Crew", and completed his first marathon in 2014.

Victorian Legislative Assembly
New seat	Member for Sunbury; 2014–present	Incumbent
