= Juliana Addison =

Australian politician (born 1974)

Juliana Addison MP
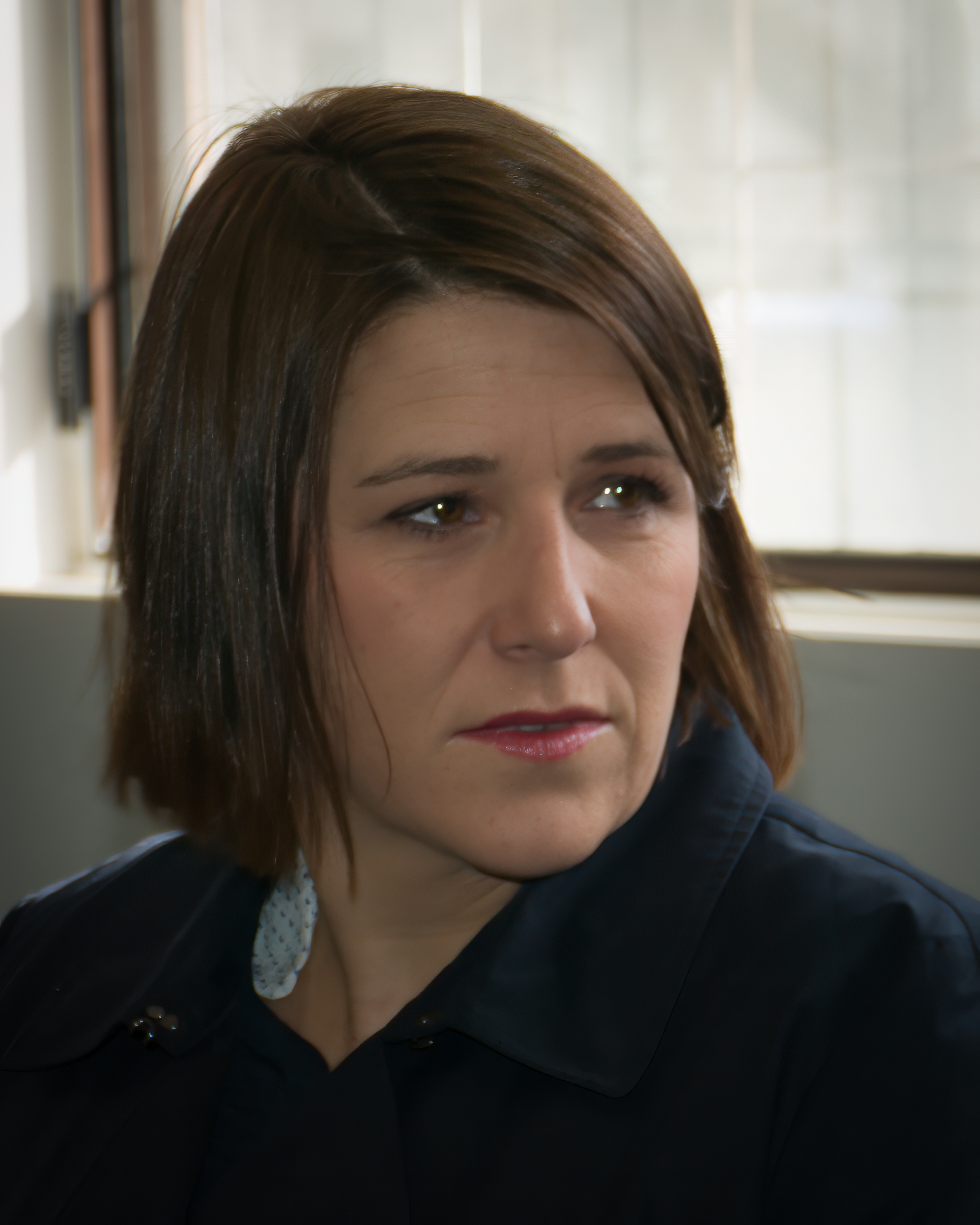
- Addison in 2019

Member of the Victorian Legislative Assembly for Wendouree
- Incumbent
- Assumed office 24 November 2018
- Preceded by: Sharon Knight

Personal details
- Born: Juliana Dickinson; 1 August 1974 (age 52) Ballarat, Victoria, Australia
- Party: Labor Party
- Education: Monash University; University of Melbourne
- Committees: Economy and Infrastructure Committee
- Website: www.julianaaddison.com.au

Juliana Marie Addison (born 1 August 1974) is an Australian politician serving as the elected member for the Electoral district of Wendouree in the Victorian Legislative Assembly. She is a member of the Australian Labor Party.

== Early career ==
For 11 years prior to the 2018 election, Addison was a teacher at Ballarat Clarendon College, where she taught history. She was also a Board Director at Ballarat Health Services. Addison has also been an organiser for the Australian Workers' Union and industrial officer for the Australian Manufacturing Workers' Union.

== Political career ==
Addison was elected as member for Wendouree at the 2018 Victorian state election after the retirement of her predecessor, Sharon Knight.

As of August 2022, she is chair of the parliamentary environment and planning committee.

Addison was re-elected at the 2022 state election for her second term, defeating Liberal candidate and former mayor of Ballarat Samantha McIntosh.

Since February 2023 Addison has been the Acting Speaker in the Legislative Assembly.

== Personal life ==
Addison lives in Ballarat with her husband and two young daughters.

Parliament of Victoria
Preceded by Sharon Knight	Member for Wendouree; 2018–present	Incumbent
