= Electoral district of Sunbury =

State electoral district of Victoria, Australia

Sunbury Victoria—Legislative Assembly
- Interactive map of electoral district boundaries from the 2022 state election
- State: Victoria
- Created: 2014
- MP: Josh Bull
- Party: Labor
- Namesake: Sunbury
- Electors: 45,588 (2018)
- Area: 340 km^{2} (131.3 sq mi)
- Demographic: Outer metropolitan

The electoral district of Sunbury is an electoral district of the Victorian Legislative Assembly in Australia. It was created in the redistribution of electoral boundaries in 2013, and came into effect at the 2014 state election.

It is a new district that was created in the fast-growing outer northwestern fringe of Melbourne from areas in the district of Macedon. It is centred on the city of Sunbury, and includes the towns of Diggers Rest, Bulla, Westmeadows and Gladstone Park.

Sunbury was estimated to be a fairly safe Labor seat with a margin of 6.5% at the time of its creation. Labor member Josh Bull became the first member for Sunbury at the 2014 election.

== Members ==
| Member | Party | Term |
|---|---|---|
| Josh Bull | Labor | 2014–present |

== Election results ==
2022 Victorian state election: Sunbury
| Party | Candidate | Votes | % | ±% |
|---|---|---|---|---|
| Labor | Josh Bull | 16,253 | 43.1 | −15.5 |
| Liberal | Simmone Cottom | 11,895 | 31.6 | −2.1 |
| Greens | Richard Burke | 2,459 | 6.5 | −1.2 |
| Animal Justice | Rohanna Mohr | 1,537 | 4.1 | +4.1 |
| Family First | Charles Pace | 1,445 | 3.8 | +3.8 |
| Independent | Laurence Pincini | 1,432 | 3.8 | +3.8 |
| Democratic Labour | Peter Bayliss | 1,317 | 3.5 | +3.5 |
| Victorian Socialists | James Gallagher | 1,164 | 3.1 | +3.1 |
| New Democrats | Rushi Vijaykumar Patel | 204 | 0.5 | +0.5 |
| Total formal votes | | 37,706 | 93.5 | –0.5 |
| Informal votes | | 2,620 | 6.5 | +0.5 |
| Turnout | | 40,326 | 88.5 | +0.8 |
Two-party-preferred result
| Labor | Josh Bull | 21,271 | 56.4 | −8.1 |
| Liberal | Simmone Cottom | 16,435 | 43.6 | +8.1 |
| Labor hold | | Swing | −8.1 | |
