= Electoral district of Narre Warren South =

State electoral district of Victoria, Australia

Narre Warren South Victoria—Legislative Assembly
- Interactive map of electoral district boundaries from the 2022 state election
- State: Victoria
- Created: 2002
- MP: Gary Maas
- Party: Labor Party
- Namesake: Narre Warren South
- Electors: 53,430 (2022)
- Area: 40 km^{2} (15.4 sq mi)
- Demographic: Metropolitan
Electorates around Narre Warren South:
Dandenong	Narre Warren North
	Narre Warren South	Berwick
Carrum	Cranbourne

The electoral district of Narre Warren South is an electorate of the Victorian Legislative Assembly, containing the suburbs of Cranbourne North, Hampton Park, Lynbrook and Narre Warren South. It has been continuously held by the Labor Party since its creation in 2002.

== History ==
The seat was created at the 2002 election. Dale Wilson was the inaugural sitting member, but he was defeated by Tim Holding staffer Judith Graley in a preselection battle in early 2006. Graley then defeated Liberal candidate Michael Shepherdson at the 2006 election, and went on to hold the seat for 12 years before retiring at the 2018 election. She was succeeded by Gary Maas, who has represented the electorate since then.

The electorate was significantly reshaped for the 2022 election due to the re-creation of the neighbouring Berwick district and the overpopulation of the Cranbourne district. The Narre Warren South district gained the entirety of Cranbourne North and the remainder of Lynbrook from the Cranbourne district, while losing the area of Berwick it contained, south of the Princes Freeway, to the new Berwick district.

== Members for Narre Warren South ==
Member	Party	Term
Dale Wilson	Labor	2002–2006
Judith Graley	Labor	2006–2018
Gary Maas	Labor	2018–present

== Election results ==
2022 Victorian state election: Narre Warren South
Party	Candidate	Votes	%	±%
Labor	Gary Maas	20,562	48.0	−4.1
Liberal	Annette Samuel	12,280	28.7	−4.5
Greens	Susanna Moore	2,836	6.6	+0.9
Family First	Jacqueline Harvey	2,495	5.8	+5.8
Freedom	Geoff Hansen	2,136	5.0	+5.0
Liberal Democrats	Christine Skrobo	1,212	2.8	+2.8
Animal Justice	Michael Gallagher	1,048	2.4	+2.4
Independent	Tylere Baker-Pearce	290	0.7	+0.7
Total formal votes		42,859	92.7	–0.2
Informal votes		3,349	7.3	+0.2
Turnout		46,208	86.5	+3.4
Two-party-preferred result
Labor	Gary Maas	24,994	58.3	−2.1
Liberal	Annette Samuel	17,865	41.7	+2.1
Labor hold		Swing	−2.1	
