= Electoral district of South-West Coast =

State electoral district of Victoria, Australia

South-West Coast Victoria—Legislative Assembly
- Interactive map of electoral district boundaries from the 2022 state election
- State: Victoria
- Created: 2002
- MP: Roma Britnell
- Party: Liberal
- Namesake: Barwon South West
- Electors: 47,500 (2018)
- Area: 6,576 km^{2} (2,539.0 sq mi)
- Demographic: Rural
Electorates around South-West Coast:
South Australia	Lowan	Lowan
South Australia	South-West Coast	Polwarth
Great Australian Bight	Great Australian Bight	Bass Strait

The electoral district of South-West Coast is an electorate of the Victorian Legislative Assembly. It was created prior to the 2002 election in order to replace the abolished seats of Portland and Warrnambool.

The seat is dominated by the town of Warrnambool, but also includes Portland, Port Fairy, Koroit, Heywood and Macarthur.

South-West Coast is located in ancestrally Liberal territory, and was thus a natural choice for Portland's former member, Denis Napthine, to transfer for the 2002 election. He barely held onto his seat in the Labor landslide of that year, seeing his margin reduced to only 0.7 percent. However, it has reverted to its previous form as a safe Liberal seat. Napthine subsequently served as Premier of Victoria from 2013 to 2014. Following his government's election loss to Labor in November 2014, Napthine resigned from parliament on 3 September 2015. Roma Britnell retained the seat for the Liberals at the ensuing by-election on 31 October.

== Members for South-West Coast ==
Member	Party	Term
Denis Napthine	Liberal	2002–2015
Roma Britnell	Liberal	2015–present

== Election results ==
2022 Victorian state election: South-West Coast
Party	Candidate	Votes	%	±%
Liberal	Roma Britnell	19,517	42.9	+8.5
Labor	Kylie Gaston	9,640	21.2	−3.4
Independent	Carol Altmann	6,564	14.4	+14.4
Independent	James Purcell	2,737	6.0	–9.4
Greens	Thomas Campbell	2,457	5.4	−0.8
Independent	Jim Doukas	1,865	4.1	+4.1
Family First	Chris Brunt	924	2.0	+2.0
Animal Justice	Jacinta Anderson	688	1.5	+1.3
Independent	Michael McCluskey	616	1.4	+0.5
Justice	James Brash Grimley	488	1.1	+1.1
Total formal votes		45,496	94.3	+0.9
Informal votes		2,723	5.7	−0.9
Turnout		48,219	90.8	+0.3
Two-party-preferred result
Liberal	Roma Britnell	26,410	58.0	+4.8
Labor	Kylie Gaston	19,086	42.0	−4.8
Liberal hold		Swing	+4.8	

== See also ==
- 2015 South-West Coast state by-election
