= Pauline Richards =

Australian politician

Pauline Richards MP

Member of the Victorian Legislative Assembly for Cranbourne
- Incumbent
- Assumed office 24 November 2018
- Preceded by: Jude Perera

Personal details
- Party: Labor Party

Pauline Louise Richards is an Australian politician. She has been a Labor Party member of the Victorian Legislative Assembly since November 2018, representing the seat of Cranbourne.

Richards, a former Whitehorse City councillor, ran as the Labor candidate for Forest Hill at the 2014 Victorian state election, and also worked as an advisor to federal MP Mike Symon and state minister Jill Hennessy.

At the 2018 state election, Richards was the Labor Party candidate in the seat of Cranbourne, after the retirement of incumbent Labor MP, Jude Perera. Richards was elected, defeating the Liberal Party candidate, Ann-Marie Hermans.

At the 2022 state election, Richards was re-elected for a second term in Cranbourne, defeating the Liberal Party candidate, Jagdeep Singh.

Parliament of Victoria
Preceded by Jude Perera	Member for Cranbourne; 2018–present	Incumbent
