= Electoral district of Cranbourne =

State electoral district of Victoria, Australia

Cranbourne Victoria—Legislative Assembly
- Interactive map of electoral district boundaries from the 2022 state election
- State: Victoria
- Created: 1992; 34 years ago
- MP: Pauline Richards
- Party: Labor Party
- Namesake: Cranbourne, Victoria
- Electors: 51,173 (2022)
- Area: 63 km^{2} (24.3 sq mi)
- Demographic: Outer metropolitan
Electorates around Cranbourne:
Carrum	Narre Warren South	Berwick
Carrum	Cranbourne
Hastings	Bass	Bass

Cranbourne is an electoral district of the Victorian Legislative Assembly. It is located south-east of Melbourne and includes the suburbs of Botanic Ridge, Cranbourne, Cranbourne East, Cranbourne West, Junction Village, as well as parts of Clyde, Clyde North, Cranbourne South, and Devon Meadows. It was created prior to the 1992 state election.

The current sitting member is Pauline Richards of the Labor Party, who has held the seat since 2018.

== History ==
Cranbourne was held by Jude Perera of the Labor Party from 2002 to 2018, with a two-party preferred margin of 2.3% at the 2014 state election. However, from 1992 to the 2002 election the seat was held by the Liberal Party, albeit with different boundaries that were more favourable to the Liberals. Additionally, the Victorian State Liberals suffered a statewide swing against them that saw them lose two-thirds of their seats at the 2002 state election.

Perera re-contested the seat at the 2006 election, and defeated Luke Martin of the Liberal Party. Perera held the seat again in 2010, holding off a challenge from ex-VFL player and brother of Gary Ablett Sr., Geoff Ablett.

In September 2017, Perera announced he will not be running at the 2018 state election. He was succeeded by Pauline Richards.

Rapid population growth of the Cranbourne area meant it was one of the most populated electorates in the state at the 2018 election, with 61,814 registered voters. A redistribution before the 2022 election reduced its area, losing the suburbs of Lynbrook and Cranbourne North to the Narre Warren South district, and Lyndhurst to the Carrum district, reducing the electorate to 51,173 enrolled voters.

== Members for Cranbourne ==
Member	Party	Term
Gary Rowe	Liberal	1992–2002
Jude Perera	Labor	2002–2018
Pauline Richards	Labor	2018–present

== Election results ==
2022 Victorian state election: Cranbourne
Party	Candidate	Votes	%	±%
Labor	Pauline Richards	18,853	46.2	−2.5
Liberal	Jagdeep Singh	11,230	27.5	−6.9
Greens	Kiran Vempati	2,282	5.6	+1.6
Family First	Bradley Harvey	2,249	5.5	+5.5
Democratic Labour	Chris Norton	2,044	5.0	+3.4
Freedom	Gerardine Frances Hansen	1,790	4.4	+4.4
Justice	Peter Bernard Philpott	1,126	2.7	−1.9
Animal Justice	Gwynne Brennan	1,006	2.5	+2.5
Independent	Ravi Ragupathy	242	0.6	+0.6
Total formal votes		40,822	92.7	+0.4
Informal votes		3,234	7.3	−0.4
Turnout		44,056	86.1	+6.2
Two-party-preferred result
Labor	Pauline Richards	24,073	59.0	−0.3
Liberal	Jagdeep Singh	16,749	41.0	+0.3
Labor hold		Swing	−0.3	

=== Graphical summary ===
Two-party-preferred vote results in Cranbourne View source data.
