= Electoral district of Hastings =

State electoral district of Victoria, Australia

Hastings Victoria—Legislative Assembly
- Interactive map of electoral district boundaries from the 2022 state election
- State: Victoria
- Created: 2002
- MP: Paul Mercurio
- Party: Labor
- Namesake: Hastings
- Electors: 51,388 (2018)
- Area: 395 km^{2} (152.5 sq mi)
- Demographic: Mixed rural and urban fringe
Electorates around Hastings:
Frankston	Carrum	Cranbourne; Bass
Mornington	Hastings	Western Port
Nepean	Western Port	Western Port

The electoral district of Hastings is an electorate of the Victorian Legislative Assembly. It was created prior to the 2002 election due to population increases in Melbourne's outer south east. It covers Hastings, Tyabb, Somerville, Bittern and part of Langwarrin. French Island is also included within the electoral boundary.

The seat is currently held by former actor and TV presenter Paul Mercurio for the Australian Labor Party.

== Members for Hastings ==
Member	Party	Term
Rosy Buchanan	Labor	2002–2006
Neale Burgess	Liberal	2006–2022
Paul Mercurio	Labor	2022–present

== Election results ==
2022 Victorian state election: Hastings
Party	Candidate	Votes	%	±%
Liberal	Briony Hutton	16,415	39.8	−5.0
Labor	Paul Mercurio	15,361	37.3	−1.4
Greens	Paul Saunders	4,118	10.0	−0.2
Animal Justice	Tyson Jack	1,736	4.2	−1.9
Freedom	Janet Felicity Benson	1,235	3.0	+3.0
Family First	Tom Sabo	1,001	2.4	+2.4
Democratic Labour	Camille De Wit	833	2.0	+2.0
Independent	Robert Whitehill	533	1.3	+1.3
Total formal votes		41,232	94.6	+0.2
Informal votes		2,369	5.4	−0.2
Turnout		43,601	89.6	+1.7
Two-party-preferred result
Labor	Paul Mercurio	21,174	51.4	+1.3
Liberal	Briony Hutton	20,058	48.6	−1.3
Labor notional hold		Swing	+1.3	
