= Roma Britnell =

Australian politician (born 1967)

Roma Britnell MP
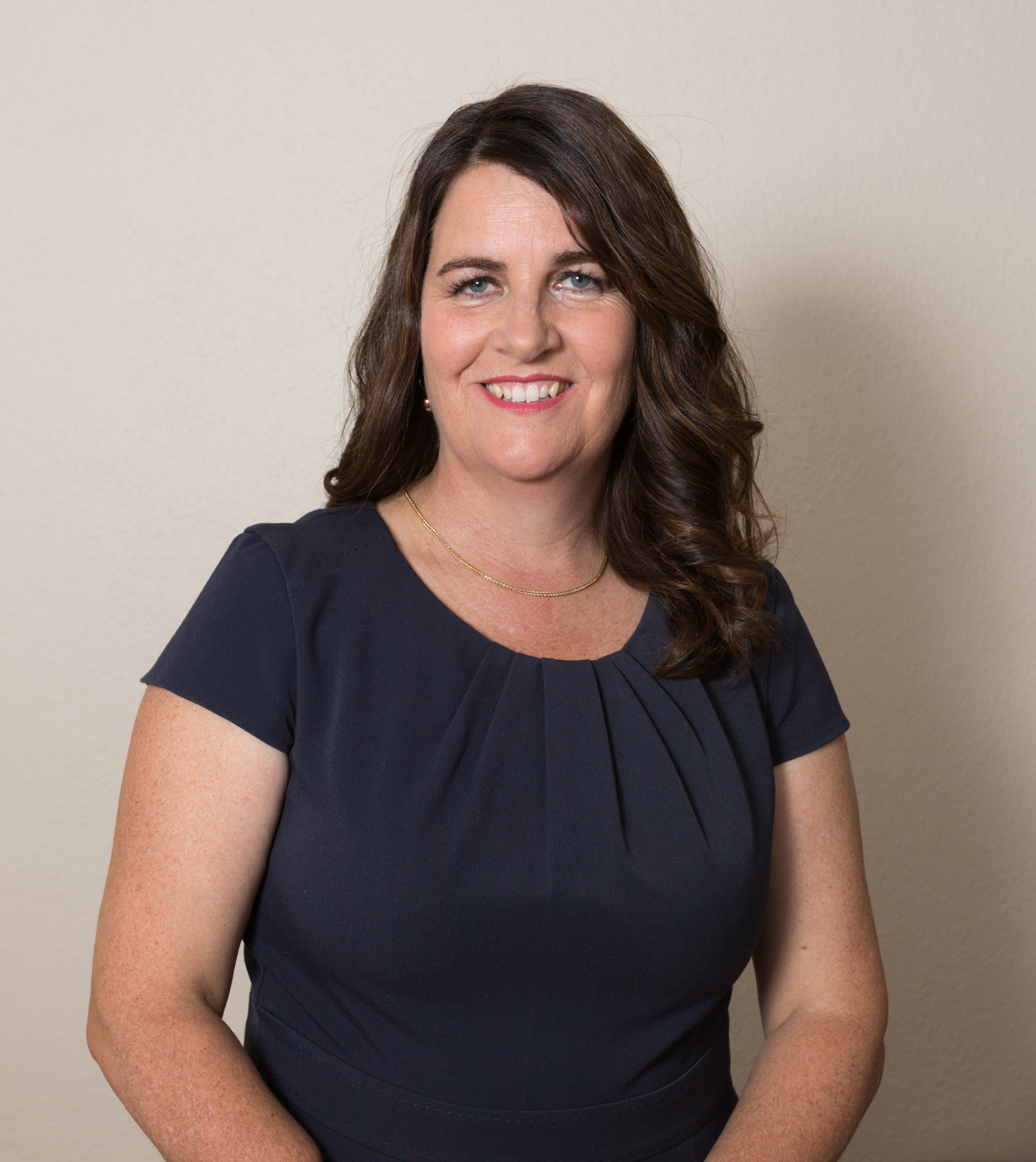

Member of the Victorian Legislative Assembly for South-West Coast
- Incumbent
- Assumed office 31 October 2015
- Preceded by: Denis Napthine

Personal details
- Born: Roma Clare Hussey; 17 January 1967 (age 59)
- Party: Liberal Party
- Children: 4
- Website: romabritnell.com.au

Roma Clare Britnell (née Hussey; born 17 January 1967) is an Australian politician. She was elected to the Victorian Legislative Assembly as a Liberal Party member for South-West Coast, at a by-election in 2015. She was re-elected in 2018 and appointed to the opposition front bench as Shadow Minister for Rural Roads, and Shadow Minister for Ports and Freight.

Britnell attended St Ann's College in Warrnambool, and trained as a nurse at Warrnambool Base Hospital. She worked as a nurse for almost 30 years and spend 15 years working in community health at the Framlingham Aboriginal Community.

Prior to her election, Britnell was the vice-president of United Dairyfarmers of Victoria (UDV), chairwoman of WestVic Dairy and was a Nuffield Farming Scholar in 2011. Britnell also served on a number of boards including the Geoffrey Gardner Foundation, Glenelg Hopkins Catchment Management Authority, Australian Dairy Farmers Federation, was Policy Councillor with the Victorian Farmers Federation, was a member of the Great South Coast Group's Economic Pillar and a committee member of the Warrnambool City Council's Food and Agriculture into China project.

She was named Victorian Rural Woman of The Year in 2009 and was named Australian Rural Woman of the Year in the same year.

== 2015 by-election ==
Britnell was pre-selected by the Liberal Party to contest the by-election to replace the retiring member for South-West Coast, former Premier Denis Napthine.

At the by-election held on 31 October 2015, Britnell obtained 40 per cent of the primary vote and claimed victory after preferences were distributed, winning 60.6 per cent of the two-candidate-preferred vote against perennial candidate Roy Reekie, who secured 39.4 per cent.

== 2018 Victorian Election ==
Britnell re-contested the seat for the Liberal Party at the 2018 state election. A total of nine candidates nominated, including incumbent independent member of the Legislative Council for Western Victoria Region, James Purcell, and former mayors of the City of Warrnambool, Kylie Gaston (Australian Labor Party) and Michael Neoh (independent), and former mayor of the Moyne Shire, Jim Doukas (Australian Country Party).

Britnell's primary vote dropped to 32 per cent, with Labor Candidate Kylie Gaston obtaining 24 percent (a 3 percent drop in the Labor vote) and James Purcell obtaining almost 17 per cent.

After the distribution of preferences, Britnell was elected with an 8.66 percent swing on a two-party-preferred basis.

Britnell was sworn in for her second term on 19 December.

== Shadow minister ==
On 14 December 2018, the Leader of the Opposition, Michael O'Brien, announced that Britnell had been appointed the Shadow Minister for Rural Roads, and Shadow Minister for Ports and Freight.

Victorian Legislative Assembly
Preceded by Denis Napthine	Member for South-West Coast; 2015–present	Incumbent
