= Victorian Legislative Assembly =

Lower house of the Parliament of Victoria, Australia

Legislative Assembly
- 60th Parliament

Type
- Type: Lower house of the Parliament of Victoria

History
- Founded: 21 November 1856; 170 years ago

Leadership
- Speaker: Maree Edwards, Labor since 2 August 2022
- Deputy Speaker: Matt Fregon, Labor since 20 December 2022
- Leader of the House: Anthony Carbines, Labor since 15 April 2026
- Government Whip: Pauline Richards, Labor since 7 February 2023
- Deputy Government Whip: Belinda Wilson, Labor since 7 February 2023
- Manager of Opposition Business: James Newbury, Liberal since December 2022
- Opposition Whip: Chris Crewther, Liberal since December 2022

Structure
- Seats: 88
- Political groups: Government (54): Labor (54); Opposition (29): Liberal (20); National (9); Crossbench (4): Greens (2); Independent (1); Ind. Labor (1); Vacant (1)
- Length of term: 4 years

Elections
- Voting system: Instant-runoff voting
- Last general election: 26 November 2022
- Next general election: 28 November 2026

Meeting place
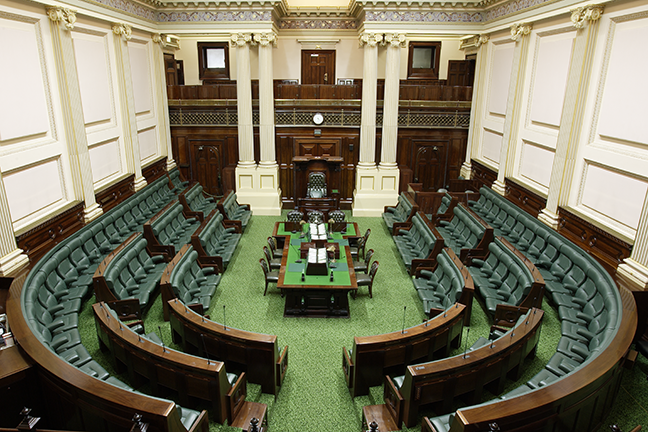
- Legislative Assembly Chamber, Parliament House, Melbourne, Victoria, Australia

Website
- Vic Legislative Assembly

The Victorian Legislative Assembly is the state lower house of the bicameral Parliament of Victoria in Australia; the state upper house being the Victorian Legislative Council. Both houses sit at Parliament House in Spring Street, Melbourne. The main colour used for the upholstery and carpets furnishing the Chamber of the Legislative Assembly is green.

The presiding officer of the Legislative Assembly is the Speaker. There are presently 88 members of the Legislative Assembly elected from single-member divisions.

== History ==
The Port Phillip District separated from the Colony of New South Wales on 1 July 1851 under an Act of the British Parliament, becoming the Colony of Victoria. The Legislative Assembly was created on 13 March 1856 with the passing of the Victorian Electoral Bill, five years after the creation of the original unicameral Legislative Council. The Assembly first met on 21 November 1856, and consisted of sixty members representing thirty-seven multi- and single-member electorates. On 1 January 1901, following the Federation of Australia, Victoria became a state of the Commonwealth of Australia, and its Parliament continued to exercise legislative powers under the new federal system.

In 1917, the Nationalist government in Victoria introduced compulsory preferential voting before the 1917 state election. This enabled the factions in the party to field competing candidates without splitting the vote by keeping preferences within the party.

== Procedure ==
Most legislation is initiated in the Legislative Assembly. The party or coalition with a majority of seats in the lower house is invited by the Governor to form government. The leader of that party subsequently becomes Premier of Victoria, and their senior colleagues become ministers responsible for various portfolios. As Australian political parties traditionally vote along party lines, almost all legislation introduced by the governing party will pass through the legislative assembly.

=== Committees ===
Committees are formed of members from one house or both houses. Committees hold inquiries into particular issues and call for input from the wider community.

- Privileges Committee
- Standing Orders Committee
- Economy and Infrastructure Committee
- Environment and Planning Committee
- Legal and Social Issues Committee

== Officials ==
=== Speaker ===
At the beginning of each new parliamentary term, the Legislative Assembly elects one of its members as a presiding officer, known as the Speaker. The House may re-elect the incumbent speaker merely by passing a motion; otherwise, a secret ballot is held. In practice, the Speaker is usually a member of the governing party or parties, who have the majority in the House. The Speaker continues to be a member of their political party, but it is left to their individual discretion as to whether or not they attend party meetings. The Speaker also continues to carry out their ordinary electorate duties as a member of Parliament and must take part in an election campaign to be re-elected as a member of Parliament.

A Deputy Speaker is also elected by the Assembly, who supports and assists the Speaker in the execution of their duties.

=== Non-member officials ===
The Legislative Assembly is also supported by a department of civil servants who provide procedural and administrative advice on the running of the Assembly, and performs other functions. The head of the department is the Clerk of the Assembly, who is assisted by a deputy clerk, an assistant clerk committees and an assistant clerk procedure.

The Assembly is also assisted by a serjeant-at-arms, who at present also holds the position of assistant clerk procedure.

== Membership and elections ==
The Legislative Assembly presently consists of 88 members, each elected in single-member electoral districts, more commonly known as electorates or seats. This is done using preferential voting, which is the same voting system used for the federal lower house, the Australian House of Representatives. Members represent approximately the same population in each electorate.

Since 2006, members of the Legislative Assembly are elected for a fixed term of 4 years, with elections occurring on the last Saturday of November every 4 years. (Note: Between 1985 and 2006, the maximum term of the Assembly was four years, but could be dissolved earlier.) There are no limits to the number of terms for which a member may seek election. Casual vacancies are filled at a by-election.

== Current distribution of seats ==
Party	Seats held
Labor	54
Liberal	20
National	9
Greens	2
Independent	1
Independent Labor	1
Vacant	1
Total	88

- 44 votes as a majority are currently required to pass legislation.

== 2022 election ==
=== Results ===
Victorian state election, 26 November 2022 Legislative Assembly << 2018–2026 >>
Enrolled voters	4,394,465				
Votes cast	3,828,791		Turnout	87.13	−3.03
Informal votes	211,791		Informal	5.53	–0.30
Summary of votes by party
Party	Primary votes	%	Swing	Seats	Change
Labor	1,339,496	37.03	–5.83	56	+1
Liberal	1,070,672	29.60	−0.83	18	–3
Greens	416,069	11.50	+0.79	4	+1
National	172,687	4.77	+0.00	9	+3
Family First	110,389	3.05	+3.05	0	±0
Animal Justice	90,797	2.51	+0.69	0	±0
Freedom	61,812	1.71	+1.71	0	±0
Victorian Socialists	48,865	1.35	+0.91	0	±0
Democratic Labour	42,385	1.17	+0.48	0	±0
Liberal Democrats	12,791	0.35	+0.23	0	±0
Shooters, Fishers, Farmers	11,588	0.32	–0.37	0	±0
Reason	10,907	0.30	–0.06	0	±0
One Nation	8,077	0.22	+0.22	0	±0
Justice	7,927	0.22	–0.04	0	±0
Legalise Cannabis	5,838	0.16	+0.16	0	±0
New Democrats	4,874	0.13	+0.13	0	±0
Angry Victorians	3,037	0.08	+0.08	0	±0
Health Australia	862	0.02	+0.02	0	±0
Transport Matters	605	0.02	–0.27	0	±0
Companions and Pets	526	0.01	+0.01	0	±0
Independent	196,796	6.44	–0.63	0	–3
Total	3,617,000			87	
Two-party-preferred
Labor	1,989,350	55.00	–2.30		
Liberal/National	1,627,650	45.00	+2.30		

== See also ==
- 2018 Victorian state election
- List of members of the Victorian Legislative Assembly
- List of elections in Victoria
- List of Victorian state by-elections
- Parliaments of the Australian states and territories
