= Results of the 2006 Victorian state election (Legislative Assembly) =

Australian state election results

Victorian state election, 25 November 2006 Legislative Assembly << 2002–2010 >>
Enrolled voters	3,353,845				
Votes cast	3,109,907		Turnout	92.73	–0.43
Informal votes	141,914		Informal	4.56	+1.14
Summary of votes by party
Party	Primary votes	%	Swing	Seats	Change
Labor	1,278,046	43.06	–4.89	55	–7
Liberal	1,022,110	34.44	+0.53	23	+6
Greens	297,931	10.04	+0.31	0	±0
National	153,299	5.17	+0.87	9	+2
Family First	127,266	4.29	+4.29	0	±0
People Power	15,226	0.51	+0.51	0	±0
Citizens Electoral Council	5,187	0.17	–0.16	0	±0
Socialist Alliance	1,102	0.04	–0.07	0	±0
Independent	67,826	2.29	–1.11	1	–1
Total	2,967,993			88	
Two-party-preferred
Labor	1,613,971	54.39	–3.38		
Liberal/National	1,353,319	45.61	+3.38		

This is a list of electoral district results for the 2006 Victorian state election.

== Results by electoral district ==
=== Albert Park ===
2006 Victorian state election: Albert Park
Party	Candidate	Votes	%	±%
Labor	John Thwaites	14,787	41.05	−7.11
Liberal	Clive Smith	12,479	34.64	+1.83
Greens	John Middleton	6,871	19.07	+1.75
People Power	Stratos Pavlis	771	2.14	+2.14
Independent	Adrian Jackson	458	1.27	+1.27
Family First	Sam Robertson	390	1.08	+1.08
Citizens Electoral Council	David Reece	269	0.75	+0.75
Total formal votes		36,025	95.67	−1.62
Informal votes		1,630	4.33	+1.62
Turnout		37,655	85.72	−2.75
Two-party-preferred result
Labor	John Thwaites	21,145	59.22	−3.28
Liberal	Clive Smith	14,560	40.78	+3.28
Labor hold		Swing	−3.28	

=== Altona ===
2006 Victorian state election: Altona
Party	Candidate	Votes	%	±%
Labor	Lynne Kosky	22,332	60.61	−7.52
Liberal	Ian Soylemez	8,804	23.89	+1.01
Greens	Andreas Bischof	3,101	8.42	−0.57
Family First	David Bernard	2,609	7.08	+7.08
Total formal votes		36,846	93.89	−1.99
Informal votes		2,398	6.11	+1.99
Turnout		39,244	93.69	+0.03
Two-party-preferred result
Labor	Lynne Kosky	25,869	70.21	−4.48
Liberal	Ian Soylemez	10,974	29.79	+4.48
Labor hold		Swing	−4.48	

=== Ballarat East ===
2006 Victorian state election: Ballarat East
Party	Candidate	Votes	%	±%
Labor	Geoff Howard	14,292	42.95	−5.87
Liberal	Geoff Hayes	11,183	33.60	−2.44
Greens	Michele Harvie	3,915	11.76	−1.36
Independent	Dianne Hadden	2,199	6.61	+6.61
Family First	Grace Bailey	1,690	5.08	+5.08
Total formal votes		33,279	96.16	−0.82
Informal votes		1,328	3.84	+0.82
Turnout		34,607	91.92	−2.27
Two-party-preferred result
Labor	Geoff Howard	18,850	56.64	−0.97
Liberal	Geoff Hayes	14,429	43.36	+0.97
Labor hold		Swing	−0.97	

=== Ballarat West ===
2006 Victorian state election: Ballarat West
Party	Candidate	Votes	%	±%
Labor	Karen Overington	17,292	47.11	−5.33
Liberal	Shane Brennan	13,934	37.96	+1.23
Greens	Belinda Coates	3,631	9.89	+2.93
Family First	Dale Butterfield	1,847	5.03	+5.03
Total formal votes		36,704	96.34	−1.19
Informal votes		1,395	3.66	+1.19
Turnout		38,099	92.29	−2.34
Two-party-preferred result
Labor	Karen Overington	20,761	56.56	−2.44
Liberal	Shane Brennan	15,948	43.44	+2.44
Labor hold		Swing	−2.44	

=== Bass ===
2006 Victorian state election: Bass
Party	Candidate	Votes	%	±%
Liberal	Ken Smith	16,584	46.36	+5.89
Labor	John Anderson	12,517	34.99	+6.98
Greens	Tully Fletcher	3,169	8.86	+3.48
Family First	Cameron Begg	1,613	4.51	+4.51
National	Jacky Abbott	1,275	3.56	+3.56
Independent	Cheryl Billing-Smith	611	1.71	+1.71
Total formal votes		35,769	95.45	−1.65
Informal votes		1,705	4.55	+1.65
Turnout		37,474	94.04	+0.05
Two-party-preferred result
Liberal	Ken Smith	19,882	55.52	+4.88
Labor	John Anderson	15,926	44.48	−4.88
Liberal hold		Swing	+4.88	

=== Bayswater ===
2006 Victorian state election: Bayswater
Party	Candidate	Votes	%	±%
Liberal	Heidi Victoria	13,162	41.09	−3.04
Labor	Peter Lockwood	11,563	36.10	−9.61
Independent	Gordon Ashley	2,935	9.16	+9.16
Greens	James Tennant	2,526	7.89	−2.27
Family First	Warwick Murphy	1,285	4.01	+4.01
People Power	Stephanie Mortimer	334	1.04	+1.04
Independent	Steve Raskovy	157	0.49	+0.49
Citizens Electoral Council	Kurt Beilharz	67	0.21	+0.21
Total formal votes		32,029	94.25	−3.12
Informal votes		1,955	5.75	+3.12
Turnout		33,984	93.57	−0.55
Two-party-preferred result
Liberal	Heidi Victoria	16,982	52.83	+5.58
Labor	Peter Lockwood	15,164	47.17	−5.58
Liberal gain from Labor		Swing	+5.58	

=== Bellarine ===
2006 Victorian state election: Bellarine
Party	Candidate	Votes	%	±%
Labor	Lisa Neville	18,014	48.49	−1.26
Liberal	Don Gibson	13,821	37.20	−2.45
Greens	Justin Teague	3,564	9.59	−1.01
Family First	Len Lengyel	1,751	4.71	+4.71
Total formal votes		37,150	96.48	−1.24
Informal votes		1,354	3.52	+1.24
Turnout		38,504	94.17	−1.04
Two-party-preferred result
Labor	Lisa Neville	21,513	57.96	−0.25
Liberal	Don Gibson	15,604	42.04	+0.25
Labor hold		Swing	−0.25	

=== Benalla ===
2006 Victorian state election: Benalla
Party	Candidate	Votes	%	±%
National	Bill Sykes	13,533	42.1	+15.6
Labor	Rob Mitchell	8,094	25.2	−16.1
Liberal	Hamish McMillan	7,396	23.0	−3.1
Greens	Kammy Cordner Hunt	2,756	7.1	+0.9
Family First	James A. Rainey	819	2.5	+2.5
Total formal votes		32,124	96.4	−1.2
Informal votes		1,211	3.6	+1.2
Turnout		33,335	93.1	
Two-party-preferred result
National	Bill Sykes	21,687	67.5	+15.5
Labor	Rob Mitchell	10,437	32.5	−15.5
National hold		Swing	+15.5	

=== Benambra ===
2006 Victorian state election: Benambra
Party	Candidate	Votes	%	±%
Liberal	Bill Tilley	12,135	38.6	−1.5
Labor	Lisa Mahood	10,358	33.0	−5.1
National	Bill Baxter	5,680	18.1	+5.5
Greens	Helen Judith Robinson	2,109	6.7	−0.3
Family First	Martin Corboy	842	2.7	+2.7
Independent	Shane Pearce	296	0.9	+0.9
Total formal votes		31,420	96.7	+0.2
Informal votes		1,083	3.3	−0.2
Turnout		32,503	92.3	
Two-party-preferred result
Liberal	Bill Tilley	18,132	57.7	+3.7
Labor	Lisa Mahood	13,288	42.3	−3.7
Liberal hold		Swing	+3.7	

=== Bendigo East ===
2006 Victorian state election: Bendigo East
Party	Candidate	Votes	%	±%
Labor	Jacinta Allan	16,038	46.88	−9.55
Liberal	Kevin Gibbins	11,809	34.52	+6.6
Greens	John Bardsley	2,464	7.20	+0.54
National	John Manning	2,193	6.41	−2.57
Family First	Gail Hardy	1,486	4.34	+4.34
People Power	Colin James	224	0.65	+0.65
Total formal votes		34,214	96.03	−2.10
Informal votes		1,413	3.97	+2.10
Turnout		35,627	93.76	−1.00
Two-party-preferred result
Labor	Jacinta Allan	19,008	55.35	−7.61
Liberal	Kevin Gibbins	15,332	44.65	+7.61
Labor hold		Swing	−7.61	

=== Bendigo West ===
2006 Victorian state election: Bendigo West
Party	Candidate	Votes	%	±%
Labor	Bob Cameron	17,120	48.46	−7.97
Liberal	Bruce McClure	10,310	29.18	+6.14
Greens	Sue-Ellen Radford	3,877	10.97	+0.79
National	Glenn Murrells	2,227	6.30	−3.88
Family First	Rachel Harrison	1,796	5.08	+5.08
Total formal votes		35,330	96.15	−1.39
Informal votes		1,413	3.85	+1.39
Turnout		36,743	92.89	−1.05
Two-party-preferred result
Labor	Bob Cameron	21,447	60.56	−5.38
Liberal	Bruce McClure	13,965	39.44	+5.38
Labor hold		Swing	−5.38	

=== Bentleigh ===
2006 Victorian state election: Bentleigh
Party	Candidate	Votes	%	±%
Labor	Rob Hudson	15,811	46.99	−0.64
Liberal	James Gobbo	13,347	39.67	−2.37
Greens	Peter D'Arcy	3,428	10.19	+0.67
Family First	Michael Portelli	916	2.72	+2.72
Citizens Electoral Council	Colin Horne	144	0.43	−0.38
Total formal votes		33,646	96.10	−0.90
Informal votes		1,365	3.90	+0.90
Turnout		35,011	93.99	−0.01
Two-party-preferred result
Labor	Rob Hudson	18,950	56.32	+1.58
Liberal	James Gobbo	14,696	43.68	−1.58
Labor hold		Swing	+1.58	

=== Box Hill ===
2006 Victorian state election: Box Hill
Party	Candidate	Votes	%	±%
Liberal	Robert Clark	16,872	49.49	+2.70
Labor	Robert Chong	11,165	32.75	−4.76
Greens	Peter Campbell	4,809	14.11	−1.59
Family First	Gary Ong	908	2.66	+2.66
People Power	Christine Cummins	339	0.99	+0.99
Total formal votes		34,093	96.68	−0.63
Informal votes		1,171	3.32	+0.63
Turnout		35,264	92.87	−0.53
Two-party-preferred result
Liberal	Robert Clark	18,827	55.22	+4.13
Labor	Robert Chong	15,267	44.78	−4.13
Liberal hold		Swing	+4.13	

=== Brighton ===
2006 Victorian state election: Brighton
Party	Candidate	Votes	%	±%
Liberal	Louise Asher	18,067	54.91	+1.72
Labor	Jane Shelton	8,473	25.75	−5.14
Greens	Jonathan Walters	4,372	13.29	−2.63
Independent	Clifford Hayes	1,398	4.25	+4.25
Family First	Mark Freeman	592	1.80	+1.80
Total formal votes		32,902	97.14	−0.53
Informal votes		968	2.86	+0.53
Turnout		33,870	91.71	+1.58
Two-party-preferred result
Liberal	Louise Asher	20,041	60.93	+3.52
Labor	Jane Shelton	12,853	39.07	−3.52
Liberal hold		Swing	+3.52	

=== Broadmeadows ===
2006 Victorian state election: Broadmeadows
Party	Candidate	Votes	%	±%
Labor	John Brumby	20,600	67.64	−7.86
Liberal	Daniel Parsons	3,928	12.90	−2.90
Greens	Emily Taylor	2,010	6.60	+2.10
Family First	Gerard Hines	1,444	4.74	+4.74
Citizens Electoral Council	Sleirman Yohanna	1,381	4.53	+1.74
People Power	Marlene Ebejer	632	2.08	+2.08
Independent	Will Marshall	459	1.51	+1.51
Total formal votes		30,454	91.74	−2.66
Informal votes		2,743	8.26	+2.66
Turnout		33,197	90.42	+0.21
Two-party-preferred result
Labor	John Brumby	24,878	81.89	+1.11
Liberal	Daniel Parsons	5,500	18.11	−1.11
Labor hold		Swing	+1.11	

=== Brunswick ===
2006 Victorian state election: Brunswick
Party	Candidate	Votes	%	±%
Labor	Carlo Carli	15,891	47.74	−4.38
Greens	Cyndi Dawes	9,890	29.71	+5.37
Liberal	Vince Arborea	5,800	17.42	+1.01
Socialist Alliance	Vanessa Hearman	645	1.94	+0.19
Family First	James McDonald	557	1.67	+1.67
People Power	Christian Astourian	505	1.52	+1.52
Total formal votes		33,288	93.84	−0.66
Informal votes		2,186	6.16	+0.66
Turnout		35,474	89.28	−2.01
Notional two-party-preferred count
Labor	Carlo Carli	25,915	77.9	−0.2
Liberal	Vince Arborea	7,372	22.1	+0.2
Two-candidate-preferred result
Labor	Carlo Carli	17,940	53.65	−5.65
Greens	Cyndi Dawes	15,498	46.35	+5.65
Labor hold		Swing	−5.65	

=== Bulleen ===
2006 Victorian state election: Bulleen
Party	Candidate	Votes	%	±%
Liberal	Nicholas Kotsiras	16,518	52.70	+3.07
Labor	Neill Campbell	10,526	33.58	−6.21
Greens	Fiona MacKenzie	2,719	8.68	−1.91
Family First	Carmen Tong	1,579	5.04	+5.04
Total formal votes		31,342	95.94	−0.64
Informal votes		1,325	4.06	+0.64
Turnout		32,667	94.16	+0.66
Two-party-preferred result
Liberal	Nicholas Kotsiras	18,182	58.43	+5.79
Labor	Neill Campbell	12,935	41.57	−5.79
Liberal hold		Swing	+5.79	

=== Bundoora ===
2006 Victorian state election: Bundoora
Party	Candidate	Votes	%	±%
Labor	Colin Brooks	16,868	53.05	−6.46
Liberal	Kane Afford	9,544	30.02	+0.42
Greens	Sarah Jefford	3,529	11.10	+1.47
Family First	Dean Cronkwright	1,550	4.88	+4.88
Citizens Electoral Council	Rod McLennan	303	0.95	−0.31
Total formal votes		31,794	95.41	−0.83
Informal votes		1,531	4.59	+0.83
Turnout		33,325	94.26	+0.26
Two-party-preferred result
Labor	Colin Brooks	20,701	65.12	−2.45
Liberal	Kane Afford	11,086	34.88	+2.45
Labor hold		Swing	−2.45	

=== Burwood ===
2006 Victorian state election: Burwood
Party	Candidate	Votes	%	±%
Labor	Bob Stensholt	14,565	42.09	−3.01
Liberal	Graham Bailey	14,272	41.24	+1.19
Greens	John Presley	4,358	12.59	+1.06
Family First	John Canavan	1,408	4.07	+4.07
Total formal votes		34,603	97.22	−0.27
Informal votes		989	2.78	+0.27
Turnout		35,592	92.97	−0.58
Two-party-preferred result
Labor	Bob Stensholt	18,581	53.73	−1.35
Liberal	Graham Bailey	16,003	46.27	+1.35
Labor hold		Swing	−1.35	

=== Carrum ===
2006 Victorian state election: Carrum
Party	Candidate	Votes	%	±%
Labor	Jenny Lindell	16,846	47.92	−5.07
Liberal	Jeff Shelley	13,392	38.10	+3.09
Greens	Carlos Lopez	3,128	8.90	−1.61
Family First	Michael McLean	1,259	3.58	+3.58
Independent	Ronnie Musster	270	0.77	+0.77
Independent	Alan Thompson	259	0.74	+0.74
Total formal votes		35,154	95.28	−1.68
Informal votes		1,741	4.72	+1.68
Turnout		36,895	93.37	−0.04
Two-party-preferred result
Labor	Jenny Lindell	19,968	56.69	−5.47
Liberal	Jeff Shelley	15,256	43.31	+5.47
Labor hold		Swing	−5.47	

=== Caulfield ===
2006 Victorian state election: Caulfield
Party	Candidate	Votes	%	±%
Liberal	Helen Shardey	17,253	53.98	+4.91
Labor	Steve Cusworth	9,343	29.23	−5.79
Greens	Peter Job	4,878	15.26	−0.65
Family First	Eric Labonne	485	1.52	+1.52
Total formal votes		31,959	96.34	−0.37
Informal votes		1,215	3.66	+0.37
Turnout		33,174	90.91	+0.34
Two-party-preferred result
Liberal	Helen Shardey	18,400	57.63	+5.30
Labor	Steve Cusworth	13,526	42.37	−5.30
Liberal hold		Swing	+5.30	

=== Clayton ===
2006 Victorian state election: Clayton
Party	Candidate	Votes	%	±%
Labor	Hong Lim	18,496	62.19	−4.23
Liberal	Michael Carty	7,064	23.75	+0.70
Greens	Siobhan Isherwood	2,798	9.41	+1.60
Family First	Emyr Aditya	1,006	3.38	+3.38
Citizens Electoral Council	Simon Hall	377	1.27	+1.27
Total formal votes		29,741	94.24	−1.44
Informal votes		1,818	5.76	+1.44
Turnout		31,559	94.49	+2.72
Two-party-preferred result
Labor	Hong Lim	20,884	70.27	−3.57
Liberal	Michael Carty	8,836	29.73	+3.57
Labor hold		Swing	−3.57	

=== Cranbourne ===
2006 Victorian state election: Cranbourne
Party	Candidate	Votes	%	±%
Labor	Jude Perera	19,719	55.10	+0.86
Liberal	Luke Martin	11,818	33.03	−3.47
Family First	Mark Hermans	2,206	6.16	+6.16
Greens	Hilary Bray	2,042	5.71	−2.13
Total formal votes		35,785	94.35	−1.88
Informal votes		2,144	5.65	+1.88
Turnout		37,929	93.56	−0.07
Two-party-preferred result
Labor	Jude Perera	21,927	61.29	+0.50
Liberal	Luke Martin	13,851	38.71	−0.50
Labor hold		Swing	+0.50	

=== Dandenong ===
2006 Victorian state election: Dandenong
Party	Candidate	Votes	%	±%
Labor	John Pandazopoulos	17,126	58.53	−6.85
Liberal	Cameron Nicholls	7,287	24.91	−1.38
Family First	Peter Dorian	2,426	8.29	+8.29
Greens	Peter Blair	2,420	8.27	+1.97
Total formal votes		29,259	93.07	−1.19
Informal votes		2,178	6.93	+1.19
Turnout		31,437	91.15	−0.43
Two-party-preferred result
Labor	John Pandazopoulos	20,077	68.67	−1.64
Liberal	Cameron Nicholls	9,162	31.33	+1.64
Labor hold		Swing	−1.64	

=== Derrimut ===
2006 Victorian state election: Derrimut
Party	Candidate	Votes	%	±%
Labor	Telmo Languiller	19,103	63.44	−10.50
Liberal	Charles Tran	5,697	18.92	+1.59
Greens	Marc Purcell	2,407	7.99	+7.99
Family First	Margaret Forster	2,240	7.44	+7.44
Citizens Electoral Council	Rod Doel	368	1.22	−7.52
Independent	Jorge Jorquera	295	0.98	+0.98
Total formal votes		30,110	91.49	−1.50
Informal votes		2,799	8.51	+1.50
Turnout		32,909	91.65	+2.23
Two-party-preferred result
Labor	Telmo Languiller	22,365	74.30	−3.00
Liberal	Charles Tran	7,735	25.70	+3.00
Labor hold		Swing	−3.00	

=== Doncaster ===
2006 Victorian state election: Doncaster
Party	Candidate	Votes	%	±%
Liberal	Mary Wooldridge	16,127	50.55	+2.57
Labor	Lidia Argondizzo	10,423	32.67	−10.08
Greens	Chris Gymer	2,360	7.40	−1.87
Independent	Irene Goonan	1,628	5.10	+5.10
Family First	Dot Peak	1,367	4.28	+4.28
Total formal votes		31,905	96.01	−0.86
Informal votes		1,325	3.99	+0.86
Turnout		33,230	93.54	+0.48
Two-party-preferred result
Liberal	Mary Wooldridge	18,541	58.12	+7.35
Labor	Lidia Argondizzo	13,359	41.88	−7.35
Liberal hold		Swing	+7.35	

=== Eltham ===
2006 Victorian state election: Eltham
Party	Candidate	Votes	%	±%
Labor	Steve Herbert	15,541	44.42	−0.24
Liberal	Craig Ondarchie	13,712	39.19	−2.83
Greens	Damian Magner	4,689	13.40	+0.08
Family First	Shane Porter	1,048	3.00	+3.00
Total formal votes		34,990	96.71	−1.27
Informal votes		1,189	3.29	+1.27
Turnout		36,179	94.61	−0.36
Two-party-preferred result
Labor	Steve Herbert	19,788	56.41	+1.71
Liberal	Craig Ondarchie	15,289	43.59	−1.71
Labor hold		Swing	+1.71	

=== Essendon ===
2006 Victorian state election: Essendon
Party	Candidate	Votes	%	±%
Labor	Judy Maddigan	16,383	49.87	−4.67
Liberal	Conrad D'Souza	10,939	33.30	+1.84
Greens	Bob Muntz	3,995	12.16	−0.29
Family First	Arthur Tsiglopoulos	997	3.03	+3.03
Independent	Philip Cutler	414	1.26	+1.26
Citizens Electoral Council	Jeremy Beck	125	0.38	−1.17
Total formal votes		32,853	95.25	−1.62
Informal votes		1,639	4.75	+1.62
Turnout		34,492	91.73	−0.73
Two-party-preferred result
Labor	Judy Maddigan	20,276	61.70	−4.22
Liberal	Conrad D'Souza	12,586	38.30	+4.22
Labor hold		Swing	−4.22	

=== Evelyn ===
2006 Victorian state election: Evelyn
Party	Candidate	Votes	%	±%
Liberal	Christine Fyffe	15,586	45.85	−0.26
Labor	Heather McTaggart	13,032	38.33	−3.77
Family First	Roger Williamson	2,513	7.39	+7.39
Greens	Justine Indigo-Rose	2,382	7.01	−1.39
People Power	Peter Byrne	483	1.42	+1.42
Total formal votes		33,996	95.63	−0.92
Informal votes		1,553	4.37	+0.92
Turnout		35,549	94.31	+0.84
Two-party-preferred result
Liberal	Christine Fyffe	17,970	52.80	+3.13
Labor	Heather McTaggart	16,061	47.20	−3.13
Liberal gain from Labor		Swing	+3.13	

=== Ferntree Gully ===
2006 Victorian state election: Ferntree Gully
Party	Candidate	Votes	%	±%
Liberal	Nick Wakeling	16,187	44.16	−1.04
Labor	Anne Eckstein	15,420	42.07	−5.00
Greens	Steve Bullock	2,608	7.11	−0.61
Family First	Allister Rouse	1,673	4.56	+4.56
People Power	Adrian Dowell	635	1.73	+1.73
Citizens Electoral Council	Ross Russell	134	0.37	+0.37
Total formal votes		36,657	94.67	−2.45
Informal votes		2,064	5.33	+2.45
Turnout		38,721	94.46	−0.11
Two-party-preferred result
Liberal	Nick Wakeling	18,342	50.04	+2.35
Labor	Anne Eckstein	18,315	49.96	−2.35
Liberal gain from Labor		Swing	+2.35	

=== Footscray ===
2006 Victorian state election: Footscray
Party	Candidate	Votes	%	±%
Labor	Marsha Thomson	16,471	52.49	−6.82
Liberal	Cam Nation	5,244	16.71	+1.74
Independent	Catherine Cumming	4,675	14.90	+4.51
Greens	Greg Ferrington	3,799	12.11	+1.96
Family First	Ron Berchy	734	2.34	+2.34
Socialist Alliance	Margarita Windisch	457	1.46	−1.25
Total formal votes		31,380	93.15	−0.20
Informal votes		2,306	6.85	+0.20
Turnout		33,686	90.33	+0.58
Two-party-preferred result
Labor	Marsha Thomson	23,428	74.67	−0.23
Liberal	Cam Nation	7,948	25.33	+0.23
Labor hold		Swing	−0.23	

=== Forest Hill ===
2006 Victorian state election: Forest Hill
Party	Candidate	Votes	%	±%
Liberal	Neil Angus	14,757	44.34	+5.68
Labor	Kirstie Marshall	14,002	42.07	−5.05
Greens	Mick Kir	2,874	8.64	−0.27
Family First	Stella Collins	1,648	4.95	+4.95
Total formal votes		33,281	96.38	−0.45
Informal votes		1,250	3.62	+0.45
Turnout		34,531	94.17	+0.03
Two-party-preferred result
Labor	Kirstie Marshall	16,920	50.82	−4.96
Liberal	Neil Angus	16,375	49.18	+4.96
Labor hold		Swing	−4.96	

=== Frankston ===
2006 Victorian state election: Frankston
Party	Candidate	Votes	%	±%
Labor	Alistair Harkness	13,703	43.47	−4.40
Liberal	Rochelle McArthur	12,849	40.76	+0.29
Greens	Wendy Smith	3,146	9.98	−0.52
Family First	Michael Pleiter	1,249	3.96	+3.96
Independent	Fletcher Davis	576	1.83	+1.83
Total formal votes		31,523	95.77	−1.16
Informal votes		1,391	4.23	+1.16
Turnout		32,914	92.81	−0.61
Two-party-preferred result
Labor	Alistair Harkness	16,621	52.71	−3.35
Liberal	Rochelle McArthur	14,910	47.29	+3.35
Labor hold		Swing	−3.35	

=== Geelong ===
2006 Victorian state election: Geelong
Party	Candidate	Votes	%	±%
Labor	Ian Trezise	17,069	48.99	−1.61
Liberal	Scott Dixon	12,317	35.35	−2.62
Greens	Bruce Lindsay	3,169	9.10	+1.75
Family First	Gary Plumridge	1,684	4.83	+4.83
People Power	Elsie Teer	603	1.73	+1.73
Total formal votes		34,842	96.30	−0.53
Informal votes		1,339	3.70	+0.53
Turnout		36,181	92.05	−1.73
Two-party-preferred result
Labor	Ian Trezise	20,213	58.33	+0.23
Liberal	Scott Dixon	14,441	41.67	−0.23
Labor hold		Swing	+0.23	

=== Gembrook ===
2006 Victorian state election: Gembrook
Party	Candidate	Votes	%	±%
Liberal	Simon Wildes	13,994	40.2	−3.7
Labor	Tammy Lobato	13,666	39.2	−2.3
Greens	Gordon Watson	3,838	11.0	−1.8
National	Peter McConachy	1,375	3.9	+3.9
Family First	Peter Gebbing	1,309	3.8	+3.8
People Power	Robyn Allcock	388	1.1	+1.1
Independent	Frank Dean	272	0.8	−1.0
Total formal votes		34,842	95.7	−1.0
Informal votes		1,551	4.3	+1.0
Turnout		36,393	94.0	+0.1
Two-party-preferred result
Labor	Tammy Lobato	17,670	50.7	−0.9
Liberal	Simon Wildes	17,172	49.3	+0.9
Labor hold		Swing	−0.9	

=== Gippsland East ===
2006 Victorian state election: Gippsland East
Party	Candidate	Votes	%	±%
Independent	Craig Ingram	13,344	38.4	−2.9
Liberal	Peter Bommer	7,566	21.8	+9.1
National	Chris Nixon	6,530	18.8	−5.1
Labor	Zach Smith	4,047	11.7	−3.1
Greens	Geoffrey De Jonge	1,709	4.9	+0.3
Family First	Dean Beveridge	1,137	3.3	+3.3
Independent	Clint Eastwood	395	1.1	+1.1
Total formal votes		34,728	95.9	−0.2
Informal votes		1,496	4.1	+0.2
Turnout		36,224	92.8	−0.7
Notional two-party-preferred count
Liberal	Peter Bommer	22,064	63.5	+3.4
Labor	Zach Smith	12,662	36.5	−3.4
Two-candidate-preferred result
Independent	Craig Ingram	20,526	59.1	−2.6
Liberal	Peter Bommer	14,202	40.9	+40.9
Independent hold		Swing	−2.6	

=== Gippsland South ===
2006 Victorian state election: Gippsland South
Party	Candidate	Votes	%	±%
National	Peter Ryan	13,818	41.5	+2.8
Labor	Steve Boyce	7,413	22.2	−6.3
Liberal	Simon Wilson	6,100	18.3	−2.8
Independent	Jo McCubbin	2,281	6.8	+6.8
Greens	Jackie Dargaville	2,221	6.7	−5.0
Family First	Clare Heath	1,357	4.1	+4.1
Citizens Electoral Council	Theo Alblas	135	0.4	+0.4
Total formal votes		33,325	95.4	−1.6
Informal votes		1,615	4.6	+1.6
Turnout		34,940	93.6	
Two-party-preferred result
National	Peter Ryan	21,932	65.8	+4.9
Labor	Steve Boyce	11,393	34.2	−4.9
National hold		Swing	+4.9	

=== Hastings ===
2006 Victorian state election: Hastings
Party	Candidate	Votes	%	±%
Liberal	Neale Burgess	16,111	44.5	−1.6
Labor	Rosy Buchanan	14,625	40.4	−3.0
Greens	Francine Buckley	2,540	7.0	−2.3
Family First	Melanie Marcin	1,748	4.8	+4.8
National	Jim King	816	2.3	+2.3
People Power	Stuart Holm	351	1.0	+1.0
Total formal votes		36,191	96.1	−0.7
Informal votes		1,475	3.9	+0.7
Turnout		37,666	94.4	
Two-party-preferred result
Liberal	Neale Burgess	18,454	51.0	+1.9
Labor	Rosy Buchanan	17,737	49.0	−1.9
Liberal gain from Labor		Swing	+1.9	

=== Hawthorn ===
2006 Victorian state election: Hawthorn
Party	Candidate	Votes	%	±%
Liberal	Ted Baillieu	18,860	56.1	+6.4
Labor	John McNally	8,647	25.7	−4.8
Greens	Lynda Birch	5,467	16.3	−3.5
Family First	Veronica Sidhu	667	2.0	+2.0
Total formal votes		33,641	97.4	+0.1
Informal votes		890	2.6	−0.1
Turnout		34,531	90.8	
Two-party-preferred result
Liberal	Ted Baillieu	20,941	62.3	+6.4
Labor	John McNally	12,694	37.7	−6.4
Liberal hold		Swing	+6.4	

=== Ivanhoe ===
2006 Victorian state election: Ivanhoe
Party	Candidate	Votes	%	±%
Labor	Craig Langdon	13,772	41.8	−10.3
Liberal	Maxwell Gratton	10,481	31.8	−2.5
Greens	Marisa Palmer	4,776	14.5	+2.4
Independent	Jenny Mulholland	3,186	9.7	+9.7
Family First	Kevin Tan	737	2.2	+2.2
Total formal votes		32,952	95.5	−1.1
Informal votes		1,567	4.5	+1.1
Turnout		34,519	92.9	
Two-party-preferred result
Labor	Craig Langdon	19,918	60.4	−2.1
Liberal	Maxwell Gratton	13,034	39.6	+2.1
Labor hold		Swing	−2.1	

=== Keilor ===
2006 Victorian state election: Keilor
Party	Candidate	Votes	%	±%
Labor	George Seitz	23,674	58.5	−5.0
Liberal	John Clifford	10,081	24.9	−4.1
Greens	Lisa Asbury	3,427	8.5	+0.9
Family First	Scott Amberley	3,321	8.2	+8.2
Total formal votes		40,503	93.7	−1.8
Informal votes		2,718	6.3	+1.8
Turnout		43,221	93.8	
Two-party-preferred result
Labor	George Seitz	28,107	69.4	+1.4
Liberal	John Clifford	12,385	30.6	−1.4
Labor hold		Swing	+1.4	

=== Kew ===
2006 Victorian state election: Kew
Party	Candidate	Votes	%	±%
Liberal	Andrew McIntosh	17,269	53.7	+4.2
Labor	Maree Williams	8,801	27.4	−3.7
Greens	Emma Henley	5,170	16.1	−1.3
Family First	Wallis Pattinsonn	628	2.0	+2.0
Independent	John Dobinson	267	0.8	+0.8
Total formal votes		32,135	97.3	+0.1
Informal votes		896	2.7	−0.1
Turnout		33,031	91.6	
Two-party-preferred result
Liberal	Andrew McIntosh	19,131	59.6	+3.6
Labor	Maree Williams	12,990	40.4	−3.6
Liberal hold		Swing	+3.6	

=== Kilsyth ===
2006 Victorian state election: Kilsyth
Party	Candidate	Votes	%	±%
Liberal	David Hodgett	15,097	43.6	−1.4
Labor	Dympna Beard	13,458	38.9	−5.9
Greens	Salore Craig	2,982	8.6	−1.6
Family First	Gillian Schwab	2,332	6.7	+6.7
Independent	Patsy Hill	742	2.1	+2.1
Total formal votes		34,611	96.1	−1.0
Informal votes		1,412	3.9	+1.0
Turnout		36,023	93.9	
Two-party-preferred result
Liberal	David Hodgett	17,428	50.4	+2.5
Labor	Dympna Beard	17,183	49.6	−2.5
Liberal gain from Labor		Swing	+2.5	

=== Kororoit ===
2006 Victorian state election: Kororoit
Party	Candidate	Votes	%	±%
Labor	Andre Haermeyer	19,978	61.6	−7.2
Liberal	Mick Alexander	5,177	16.0	−1.9
Family First	Tania Walters	4,218	13.0	+13.0
Greens	Marcus Power	2,346	7.2	+7.2
Citizens Electoral Council	Andre Kozlowski	702	2.2	+2.2
Total formal votes		32,421	92.2	−1.9
Informal votes		2,745	7.8	+1.9
Turnout		35,166	92.1	
Two-party-preferred result
Labor	Andre Haermeyer	24,482	75.6	−1.5
Liberal	Mick Alexander	7,920	24.4	+1.5
Labor hold		Swing	−1.5	

=== Lara ===
2006 Victorian state election: Lara
Party	Candidate	Votes	%	±%
Labor	John Eren	20,860	59.2	−5.8
Liberal	Angelo Kakouros	9,139	25.9	+0.4
Family First	Peter Haines	2,894	8.2	+8.2
Greens	Catherine Jones	2,344	6.7	+0.0
Total formal votes		35,237	94.0	−2.2
Informal votes		2,258	6.0	+2.2
Turnout		37,495	92.6	
Two-party-preferred result
Labor	John Eren	23,872	67.7	−4.6
Liberal	Angelo Kakouros	11,365	32.3	+4.6
Labor hold		Swing	−4.6	

=== Lowan ===
2006 Victorian state election: Lowan
Party	Candidate	Votes	%	±%
National	Hugh Delahunty	16,624	47.7	+7.0
Labor	Paul Battista	7,803	22.4	−4.7
Liberal	Katrina Rainsford	7,798	22.4	−5.2
Greens	Rob Daly	1,483	4.3	−0.3
Family First	Graeme Presser	1,168	3.3	+3.3
Total formal votes		34,876	96.4	−1.1
Informal votes		1,295	3.6	+1.1
Turnout		36,171	94.7	
Two-party-preferred result
National	Hugh Delahunty	25,169	72.1	+5.0
Labor	Paul Battista	9,748	27.9	−5.0
National hold		Swing	+5.0	

=== Lyndhurst ===
2006 Victorian state election: Lyndhurst
Party	Candidate	Votes	%	±%
Labor	Tim Holding	20,681	65.3	−3.0
Liberal	Gary Anderton	7,189	22.7	+0.1
Family First	Jenny Walsh	2,035	6.4	+6.4
Greens	Andrew Henley	1,397	4.4	−3.1
Independent	Gordon Ford	375	1.2	−0.5
Total formal votes		31,677	93.4	−1.8
Informal votes		2,249	6.6	+1.8
Turnout		33,926	92.7	
Two-party-preferred result
Labor	Tim Holding	22,642	71.5	−3.6
Liberal	Gary Anderton	9,034	28.5	+3.6
Labor hold		Swing	−3.6	

=== Macedon ===
2006 Victorian state election: Macedon
Party	Candidate	Votes	%	±%
Labor	Joanne Duncan	17,667	45.4	−7.2
Liberal	Robyne Head	12,190	31.3	−4.3
Greens	Leigh Johnson	3,139	8.1	−2.4
Independent	Steve Medcraft	2,623	6.7	+6.7
Independent	Dave Barry	1,651	4.2	+4.2
Family First	Frank O'Connor	1,014	2.6	+2.6
People Power	Rob Guthrie	655	1.7	+1.7
Total formal votes		38,939	96.2	−1.4
Informal votes		1,534	3.8	+1.4
Turnout		40,473	94.8	
Two-party-preferred result
Labor	Joanne Duncan	22,649	58.2	−1.0
Liberal	Robyne Head	16,290	41.8	+1.0
Labor hold		Swing	−1.0	

=== Malvern ===
2006 Victorian state election: Malvern
Party	Candidate	Votes	%	±%
Liberal	Michael O'Brien	17,927	56.9	+1.8
Labor	Paul Vout	8,555	27.1	−2.7
Greens	Tania Giles	3,959	12.6	−0.8
People Power	Deborah Holmes	590	1.9	+1.9
Family First	Ann Grauer	484	1.5	+1.5
Total formal votes		31,515	97.0	−0.4
Informal votes		964	3.0	+0.4
Turnout		32,479	86.7	
Two-party-preferred result
Liberal	Michael O'Brien	19,313	61.3	+1.1
Labor	Paul Vout	12,180	38.7	−1.1
Liberal hold		Swing	+1.1	

=== Melbourne ===
2006 Victorian state election: Melbourne
Party	Candidate	Votes	%	±%
Labor	Bronwyn Pike	14,149	44.6	−0.7
Greens	Richard Di Natale	8,704	27.4	+3.2
Liberal	Steve Papas	7,009	22.1	+1.1
Independent	Kevin Chamberlin	866	2.7	−3.2
People Power	Isabell Collins	526	1.7	+1.7
Family First	Rebecca Gebbing	496	1.6	+1.6
Total formal votes		31,750	96.3	+0.4
Informal votes		1,214	3.7	−0.4
Turnout		32,964	84.8	
Notional two-party-preferred count
Labor	Bronwyn Pike	22,677	71.4	−0.7
Liberal	Steve Papas	9,070	28.6	+0.7
Two-candidate-preferred result
Labor	Bronwyn Pike	16,512	52.0	+0.1
Greens	Richard Di Natale	15,238	48.0	−0.1
Labor hold		Swing	+0.1	

=== Melton ===
2006 Victorian state election: Melton
Party	Candidate	Votes	%	±%
Labor	Don Nardella	18,442	54.4	−0.7
Liberal	Graham Hooper	9,430	27.8	+2.9
Family First	Pamela Lee	2,242	6.6	+6.6
Greens	Jeremy Sanders	2,177	6.4	−1.0
Independent	John Southall	856	2.5	+2.5
Independent	John Goodman	729	2.2	−1.0
Total formal votes		33,876	94.1	−1.4
Informal votes		2,123	5.9	+1.4
Turnout		35,999	93.0	
Two-party-preferred result
Labor	Don Nardella	21,513	63.5	−1.8
Liberal	Graham Hooper	12,345	36.5	+1.8
Labor hold		Swing	−1.8	

=== Mildura ===
2006 Victorian state election: Mildura
Party	Candidate	Votes	%	±%
National	Peter Crisp	12,808	40.2	+15.0
Independent	Russell Savage	10,822	34.0	−17.7
Liberal	Gavin Sedgmen	3,686	11.6	+1.3
Labor	Alison Smith	2,120	6.7	−2.8
Family First	Tim Middleton	1,140	3.6	+3.6
Greens	Bruce Rivendell	678	2.1	+0.4
Independent	Chris Katis	585	1.8	+1.8
Total formal votes		31,839	95.1	−1.8
Informal votes		1,632	4.9	+1.8
Turnout		33,471	92.2	
Notional two-party-preferred count
National	Peter Crisp	22,507	70.7	+14.0
Labor	Alison Smith	9,330	29.3	−14.0
Two-candidate-preferred result
National	Peter Crisp	17,854	56.1	+24.5
Independent	Russell Savage	13,985	43.9	−24.5
National gain from Independent		Swing	+24.5	

=== Mill Park ===
2006 Victorian state election: Mill Park
Party	Candidate	Votes	%	±%
Labor	Lily D'Ambrosio	21,288	62.0	−8.1
Liberal	Adam Papaevangelou	7,637	22.3	+1.3
Family First	Carmel McLeod	2,571	7.5	+7.5
Greens	Benedict Hughes	2,071	6.0	−0.2
People Power	Christine Stow	741	2.2	+2.2
Total formal votes		34,308	94.4	−1.2
Informal votes		2,036	5.6	+1.2
Turnout		36,344	94.7	
Two-party-preferred result
Labor	Lily D'Ambrosio	24,276	70.8	−6.0
Liberal	Adam Papaevangelou	10,018	29.2	+6.0
Labor hold		Swing	−6.0	

=== Mitcham ===
2006 Victorian state election: Mitcham
Party	Candidate	Votes	%	±%
Labor	Tony Robinson	13,305	40.1	−7.7
Liberal	Philip Daw	13,085	39.5	+1.6
Greens	Rob Redman	3,843	11.6	+1.0
Family First	Miriam Rawson	1,501	4.5	+4.5
Independent	Peter Allan	936	2.8	+2.8
People Power	Sharon Partridge	490	1.5	+1.5
Total formal votes		33,160	96.5	−0.9
Informal votes		1,205	3.5	+0.9
Turnout		34,365	94.5	
Two-party-preferred result
Labor	Tony Robinson	17,234	52.0	−5.7
Liberal	Philip Daw	15,926	48.0	+5.7
Labor hold		Swing	−5.7	

=== Monbulk ===
2006 Victorian state election: Monbulk
Party	Candidate	Votes	%	±%
Labor	James Merlino	13,263	40.6	−3.0
Liberal	Clive Larkman	12,212	37.4	-0.0
Greens	Robert Stephen	5,278	16.2	+0.4
Family First	Carl Huybers	1,359	4.2	+4.2
People Power	Joanne Stride	547	1.7	+1.7
Total formal votes		32,659	95.8	−1.3
Informal votes		1,415	4.2	+1.3
Turnout		34,074	94.0	
Two-party-preferred result
Labor	James Merlino	18,511	56.7	−1.6
Liberal	Clive Larkman	14,148	43.3	+1.6
Labor hold		Swing	−1.6	

=== Mordialloc ===
2006 Victorian state election: Mordialloc
Party	Candidate	Votes	%	±%
Labor	Janice Munt	16,026	45.3	−0.8
Liberal	Stephen Hartney	14,405	40.8	−2.0
Greens	Shana Nerenberg	3,544	10.0	−0.1
Family First	Jadah Milroy	1,371	3.9	+3.9
Total formal votes		35,346	96.0	−1.1
Informal votes		1,480	4.0	+1.1
Turnout		36,826	93.8	
Two-party-preferred result
Labor	Janice Munt	18,926	53.5	−1.0
Liberal	Stephen Hartney	16,420	46.5	+1.0
Labor hold		Swing	−1.0	

=== Mornington ===
2006 Victorian state election: Mornington
Party	Candidate	Votes	%	±%
Liberal	David Morris	18,561	55.8	+6.4
Labor	William Puls	9,379	28.2	−11.1
Greens	Malcolm Jones	3,370	10.1	−1.3
Family First	Thea Clarke	1,083	3.3	+3.3
People Power	Mark Fleming	890	2.7	+2.7
Total formal votes		33,283	96.5	−1.2
Informal votes		1,203	3.5	+1.2
Turnout		34,486	93.4	
Two-party-preferred result
Liberal	David Morris	20,582	61.9	+10.1
Labor	William Puls	12,695	38.1	−10.1
Liberal hold		Swing	+10.1	

=== Morwell ===
2006 Victorian state election: Morwell
Party	Candidate	Votes	%	±%
Labor	Brendan Jenkins	13,347	40.6	−2.6
National	Russell Northe	9,077	27.6	+15.3
Liberal	Stephen Parker	4,608	14.0	−5.3
Independent	Lisa Proctor	2,938	8.9	+8.9
Greens	Jeffrey Wrathall	1,668	5.1	−0.8
Family First	Katy Koo	1,264	3.8	+3.8
Total formal votes		32,902	95.8	−0.5
Informal votes		1,455	4.2	+0.5
Turnout		34,357	93.7	
Two-party-preferred result
National	Russell Northe	17,173	52.2	+52.2
Labor	Brendan Jenkins	15,729	47.8	−7.1
National gain from Labor		Swing	N/A	

=== Mount Waverley ===
2006 Victorian state election: Mount Waverley
Party	Candidate	Votes	%	±%
Liberal	Michael Gidley	14,711	44.4	−0.2
Labor	Maxine Morand	13,858	41.8	−2.6
Greens	John Poppins	2,657	8.0	−0.5
Family First	John Boland	1,147	3.5	+3.5
People Power	Kali Paxinos	574	1.7	+1.7
Independent	N H Smith	198	0.6	+0.6
Total formal votes		33,145	96.1	−0.9
Informal votes		1,347	3.9	+0.9
Turnout		34,492	94.2	
Two-party-preferred result
Labor	Maxine Morand	16,675	50.3	−2.0
Liberal	Michael Gidley	16,470	49.7	+2.0
Labor hold		Swing	−2.0	

=== Mulgrave ===
2006 Victorian state election: Mulgrave
Party	Candidate	Votes	%	±%
Labor	Daniel Andrews	17,491	58.8	−2.9
Liberal	Ashton Ashokkumar	8,502	28.6	−2.3
Greens	Jon Owen	1,909	6.4	+0.3
Family First	Penny Badwal	1,839	6.2	+6.2
Total formal votes		29,741	94.1	−1.8
Informal votes		1,880	5.9	+1.8
Turnout		31,621	93.1	
Two-party-preferred result
Labor	Daniel Andrews	19,515	65.6	−0.6
Liberal	Ashton Ashokkumar	10,226	34.4	+0.6
Labor hold		Swing	−0.6	

=== Murray Valley ===
2006 Victorian state election: Murray Valley
Party	Candidate	Votes	%	±%
National	Ken Jasper	16,781	50.9	+7.8
Labor	Lauren O'Neill	7,224	21.9	−8.9
Liberal	Nick McHugh	5,795	17.6	−2.9
Greens	Carol Kunert	1,794	5.4	−0.1
Family First	Garry Duke	1,368	4.2	+4.2
Total formal votes		32,962	96.3	−0.8
Informal votes		1,265	3.7	+0.8
Turnout		34,227	93.2	
Two-party-preferred result
National	Ken Jasper	23,637	71.8	+7.9
Labor	Lauren O'Neill	9,302	28.2	−7.9
National hold		Swing	+7.9	

=== Narracan ===
2006 Victorian state election: Narracan
Party	Candidate	Votes	%	±%
Liberal	Gary Blackwood	14,720	42.0	+8.5
Labor	Ian Maxfield	13,956	39.8	−6.7
Greens	Kate Jackson	2,506	7.2	+1.3
National	John Verhoeven	2,065	5.9	−2.4
Family First	Terry McKenna	1,366	3.9	+3.9
People Power	Roger Marks	271	0.8	+0.8
Citizens Electoral Council	Steven Bird	138	0.4	+0.4
Total formal votes		35,022	96.1	−0.9
Informal votes		1,410	3.9	+0.9
Turnout		36,432	93.8	
Two-party-preferred result
Liberal	Gary Blackwood	18,440	52.7	+9.5
Labor	Ian Maxfield	16,582	47.3	−9.5
Liberal gain from Labor		Swing	+9.5	

=== Narre Warren North ===
2006 Victorian state election: Narre Warren North
Party	Candidate	Votes	%	±%
Labor	Luke Donnellan	17,412	52.3	−2.8
Liberal	Mick Morland	11,197	33.6	−3.7
Greens	Bree Taylor	2,312	6.9	−0.7
Family First	Peterine Smulders	1,990	6.0	+6.0
People Power	Ian Murphy	374	1.1	+1.1
Total formal votes		33,285	95.5	−1.1
Informal votes		1,575	4.5	+1.1
Turnout		34,860	93.7	
Two-party-preferred result
Labor	Luke Donnellan	19,716	59.2	−0.5
Liberal	Mick Morland	13,569	40.8	+0.5
Labor hold		Swing	−0.5	

=== Narre Warren South ===
2006 Victorian state election: Narre Warren South
Party	Candidate	Votes	%	±%
Labor	Judith Graley	21,853	52.8	−5.5
Liberal	Michael Shepherdson	13,993	33.8	−1.8
Family First	Bronwyn Rawlins	2,870	6.9	+6.9
Greens	Meg Tanti	2,659	6.4	+0.3
Total formal votes		41,375	95.7	−0.7
Informal votes		1,838	4.3	+0.7
Turnout		43,213	94.2	
Two-party-preferred result
Labor	Judith Graley	25,257	61.1	−1.5
Liberal	Michael Shepherdson	16,114	38.9	+1.5
Labor hold		Swing	−1.5	

=== Nepean ===
2006 Victorian state election: Nepean
Party	Candidate	Votes	%	±%
Liberal	Martin Dixon	17,658	54.6	+7.4
Labor	Anne Marshall	10,315	31.9	−9.5
Greens	Henry Kelsall	3,502	10.8	−0.5
Family First	Craig Nelson	872	2.7	+2.7
Total formal votes		32,347	95.6	−1.5
Informal votes		1,506	4.4	+1.5
Turnout		33,853	92.9	
Two-party-preferred result
Liberal	Martin Dixon	19,203	59.4	+9.2
Labor	Anne Marshall	13,138	40.6	−9.2
Liberal hold		Swing	+9.2	

=== Niddrie ===
2006 Victorian state election: Niddrie
Party	Candidate	Votes	%	±%
Labor	Rob Hulls	17,034	53.8	−6.3
Liberal	James Buonopane	9,972	31.5	+2.0
Greens	Gwen Lee	2,893	9.1	+1.8
Family First	Mark Markovic	1,789	5.6	+5.6
Total formal votes		31,688	93.7	−1.9
Informal votes		2,113	6.3	+1.9
Turnout		33,801	93.5	
Two-party-preferred result
Labor	Rob Hulls	19,396	61.2	−5.4
Liberal	James Buonopane	12,288	38.8	+5.4
Labor hold		Swing	−5.4	

=== Northcote ===
2006 Victorian state election: Northcote
Party	Candidate	Votes	%	±%
Labor	Fiona Richardson	17,508	52.6	−2.6
Greens	Alex Bhathal	9,131	27.4	+2.0
Liberal	Graham Watt	5,092	15.3	−1.5
Family First	Daniel Willis	1,065	3.2	+3.2
Independent	Darren Lewin-Hill	511	1.5	+1.5
Total formal votes		33,307	95.3	−0.5
Informal votes		1,625	4.7	+0.5
Turnout		34,932	90.5	
Notional two-party-preferred count
Labor	Fiona Richardson	26,737	80.3	+2.0
Liberal	Graham Watt	6,562	19.7	−2.0
Two-candidate-preferred result
Labor	Fiona Richardson	19,484	58.5	+0.6
Greens	Alex Bhathal	13,813	41.5	−0.6
Labor hold		Swing	+0.6	

=== Oakleigh ===
2006 Victorian state election: Oakleigh
Party	Candidate	Votes	%	±%
Labor	Ann Barker	15,232	49.8	−4.4
Liberal	Colin Dixon	10,238	33.5	+2.4
Greens	Matthew Billman	4,142	13.6	+2.8
Family First	Joyce Khoo	947	3.1	+3.1
Total formal votes		30,559	96.1	−0.8
Informal votes		1,230	3.9	+0.8
Turnout		31,789	92.2	
Two-party-preferred result
Labor	Ann Barker	19,031	62.4	−2.8
Liberal	Colin Dixon	11,481	37.6	+2.8
Labor hold		Swing	−2.8	

=== Pascoe Vale ===
2006 Victorian state election: Pascoe Vale
Party	Candidate	Votes	%	±%
Labor	Christine Campbell	19,733	60.3	−6.7
Liberal	Claude Tomisich	7,679	23.4	+0.9
Greens	David Collis	4,003	12.2	+3.4
Family First	Stefan Pittari	1,104	3.4	+3.4
Citizens Electoral Council	Noelene Isherwood	229	0.7	−0.9
Total formal votes		32,748	93.5	−1.7
Informal votes		2,272	6.5	+1.7
Turnout		35,020	90.7	
Two-party-preferred result
Labor	Christine Campbell	23,828	72.8	−1.4
Liberal	Claude Tomisich	8,912	27.2	+1.4
Labor hold		Swing	−1.4	

=== Polwarth ===
2006 Victorian state election: Polwarth
Party	Candidate	Votes	%	±%
Liberal	Terry Mulder	19,598	53.5	+5.2
Labor	Darren Cheeseman	10,665	29.1	−1.9
Greens	Natalie Atherden	3,520	9.6	+0.8
Family First	Trevor Pearce	1,561	4.3	+4.3
National	Charles Neal	1,276	3.5	−6.8
Total formal votes		36,620	96.5	+0.3
Informal votes		1,334	3.5	−0.3
Turnout		37,954	93.9	
Two-party-preferred result
Liberal	Terry Mulder	22,220	60.7	+1.2
Labor	Darren Cheeseman	14,394	39.3	−1.2
Liberal hold		Swing	+1.2	

=== Prahran ===
2006 Victorian state election: Prahran
Party	Candidate	Votes	%	±%
Liberal	Clem Newton-Brown	13,136	41.9	+0.9
Labor	Tony Lupton	11,518	36.7	−1.3
Greens	Justin Walker	6,315	20.1	+2.1
Family First	Gary Pinto	402	1.3	+1.3
Total formal votes		31,371	96.3	−0.8
Informal votes		1,201	3.7	+0.8
Turnout		32,572	85.0	
Two-party-preferred result
Labor	Tony Lupton	16,800	53.6	−0.8
Liberal	Clem Newton-Brown	14,571	46.4	+0.8
Labor hold		Swing	−0.8	

=== Preston ===
2006 Victorian state election: Preston
Party	Candidate	Votes	%	±%
Labor	Robin Scott	19,809	61.6	−5.1
Liberal	Peter Hammond	6,539	20.3	+1.5
Greens	Chris Chaplin	4,400	13.7	+0.4
Family First	Christopher Field	1,141	3.5	+3.5
Citizens Electoral Council	Robert Barwick	281	0.9	−0.3
Total formal votes		32,170	93.2	−2.3
Informal votes		2,339	6.8	+2.3
Turnout		34,509	91.2	
Two-party-preferred result
Labor	Robin Scott	24,222	75.3	−1.9
Liberal	Peter Hammond	7,944	24.7	+1.9
Labor hold		Swing	−1.9	

=== Richmond ===
2006 Victorian state election: Richmond
Party	Candidate	Votes	%	±%
Labor	Richard Wynne	14,855	46.4	−1.1
Greens	Gurm Sekhon	7,900	24.7	−3.9
Liberal	Maina Walkley	6,365	19.9	+0.1
Independent	Stephen Jolly	1,805	5.6	+3.6
People Power	Richard Grummet	497	1.6	+1.6
Family First	Ann Bown Seeley	443	1.4	+1.4
Independent	Luke Watts	146	0.5	+0.5
Total formal votes		32,011	95.6	−1.2
Informal votes		1,485	4.4	+1.2
Turnout		33,496	86.0	
Notional two-party-preferred count
Labor	Richard Wynne	24,060	75.2	−0.4
Liberal	Maina Walkley	7,948	24.8	+0.4
Two-candidate-preferred result
Labor	Richard Wynne	17,170	53.6	+0.5
Greens	Gurm Sekhon	14,841	46.4	−0.5
Labor hold		Swing	+0.5	

=== Ripon ===
2006 Victorian state election: Ripon
Party	Candidate	Votes	%	±%
Labor	Joe Helper	15,461	46.8	−5.6
Liberal	Vic Dunn	11,650	35.3	+1.4
National	Robyn Smith	2,811	8.5	+0.7
Greens	Steven Morse	1,970	6.0	+1.2
Family First	Leanne Rawson	1,149	3.5	+3.5
Total formal votes		33,041	96.3	−0.9
Informal votes		1,268	3.7	+0.9
Turnout		34,309	94.1	
Two-party-preferred result
Labor	Joe Helper	17,964	54.3	−3.1
Liberal	Vic Dunn	15,090	45.7	+3.1
Labor hold		Swing	−3.1	

=== Rodney ===
2006 Victorian state election: Rodney
Party	Candidate	Votes	%	±%
National	Paul Weller	12,799	40.2	+5.9
Liberal	Neil Repacholi	10,135	31.8	+1.6
Labor	Nicola Castleman	5,778	18.1	−7.4
Family First	Paul Edward	1,079	3.4	+3.4
Greens	Beck Lowe	1,019	3.2	−1.2
Independent	Tony Murphy	681	2.1	+2.1
Independent	Jeff Simmons	377	1.2	+1.2
Total formal votes		31,868	94.8	−2.0
Informal votes		1,757	5.2	+2.0
Turnout		33,625	94.3	
Notional two-party-preferred count
National	Paul Weller	23,841	74.8	+8.4
Labor	Nicola Castleman	8,026	25.2	−8.4
Two-candidate-preferred result
National	Paul Weller	17,334	54.4	−5.6
Liberal	Neil Repacholi	14,534	45.6	+5.6
National hold		Swing	−5.6	

=== Sandringham ===
2006 Victorian state election: Sandringham
Party	Candidate	Votes	%	±%
Liberal	Murray Thompson	17,342	52.6	+3.6
Labor	Noel Pullen	9,676	29.4	−4.7
Greens	Bruce McPhate	4,197	12.7	−0.3
Independent	Sonia Castelli	1,037	3.1	+3.1
Family First	Stuart Campbell	700	2.1	+2.1
Total formal votes		32,952	97.0	−0.6
Informal votes		1,032	3.0	+0.6
Turnout		33,984	93.4	
Two-party-preferred result
Liberal	Murray Thompson	19,332	58.7	+5.7
Labor	Noel Pullen	13,615	41.3	−5.7
Liberal hold		Swing	+5.7	

=== Scoresby ===
2006 Victorian state election: Scoresby
Party	Candidate	Votes	%	±%
Liberal	Kim Wells	18,333	53.1	+1.8
Labor	Gerry Raleigh	11,181	32.4	−8.7
Family First	Peter Lake	2,338	6.8	+6.8
Greens	Rex Thompson	2,246	6.5	−1.0
People Power	John Tibble	417	1.2	+1.2
Total formal votes		34,515	95.9	−1.2
Informal votes		1,464	4.1	+1.2
Turnout		35,979	94.1	
Two-party-preferred result
Liberal	Kim Wells	21,110	61.2	+7.9
Labor	Gerry Raleigh	13,400	38.8	−7.9
Liberal hold		Swing	+7.9	

=== Seymour ===
2006 Victorian state election: Seymour
Party	Candidate	Votes	%	±%
Labor	Ben Hardman	15,987	46.4	−6.1
Liberal	Mike Dalmau	13,237	38.4	+0.6
Greens	Sean O'Sullivan	3,213	9.3	−0.4
Family First	Josh Dolan	1,148	3.3	+3.3
People Power	Robert Gordon	858	2.5	+2.5
Total formal votes		34,443	96.1	−1.4
Informal votes		1,390	3.9	+1.4
Turnout		35,833	94.0	
Two-party-preferred result
Labor	Ben Hardman	19,517	56.7	−2.8
Liberal	Mike Dalmau	14,926	43.3	+2.8
Labor hold		Swing	−2.8	

=== Shepparton ===
2006 Victorian state election: Shepparton
Party	Candidate	Votes	%	±%
National	Jeanette Powell	15,743	48.4	+19.6
Liberal	Stephen Merrylees	8,427	25.9	−4.1
Labor	James Taylor	6,174	19.0	−2.9
Greens	Doug Ralph	1,519	4.7	+1.4
Family First	Neil Meyer	640	2.0	+2.0
Total formal votes		32,503	96.0	−0.4
Informal votes		1,346	4.0	+0.4
Turnout		33,849	93.5	
Notional two-party-preferred count
National	Jeanette Powell	24,264	74.7	+9.5
Labor	James Taylor	8,239	25.3	−9.5
Two-candidate-preferred result
National	Jeanette Powell	21,677	66.7	+12.4
Liberal	Stephen Merrylees	10,838	33.3	−12.4
National hold		Swing	+12.4	

=== South Barwon ===
2006 Victorian state election: South Barwon
Party	Candidate	Votes	%	±%
Labor	Michael Crutchfield	17,187	43.9	−3.5
Liberal	Michael King	16,103	41.2	+1.7
Greens	Matthew Walters	3,537	9.0	−0.3
Family First	Jonathan Tinney	1,821	4.7	+4.7
Independent	John Lambert	464	1.2	+1.2
Total formal votes		39,112	96.9	−0.2
Informal votes		1,239	3.1	+0.2
Turnout		40,351	93.8	
Two-party-preferred result
Labor	Michael Crutchfield	20,446	52.3	−2.7
Liberal	Michael King	18,666	47.7	+2.7
Labor hold		Swing	−2.7	

=== South-West Coast ===
2006 Victorian state election: South-West Coast
Party	Candidate	Votes	%	±%
Liberal	Denis Napthine	16,754	45.3	+5.0
Labor	Roy Reekie	14,162	38.3	−3.0
Greens	Phoebe Adams	1,991	5.4	−1.6
National	David O'Brien	1,566	4.2	−7.3
Family First	Barry Wilson	1,257	3.4	+3.4
People Power	Mike Noske	1,241	3.4	+3.4
Total formal votes		36,981	95.8	−1.1
Informal votes		1,618	4.2	+1.1
Turnout		38,599	93.4	
Two-party-preferred result
Liberal	Denis Napthine	19,982	54.0	+3.3
Labor	Roy Reekie	17,018	46.0	−3.3
Liberal hold		Swing	+3.3	

=== Swan Hill ===
2006 Victorian state election: Swan Hill
Party	Candidate	Votes	%	±%
National	Peter Walsh	14,302	47.4	+12.5
Liberal	Suellen Tomamichel	7,541	25.0	−1.6
Labor	Glenn Morrison	5,582	18.5	−7.9
Greens	Simon Roberts	1,189	3.9	−1.3
Family First	Martin Jones	1,004	3.3	+3.3
Citizens Electoral Council	Trudy Campbell	534	1.8	+1.8
Total formal votes		30,152	95.3	−1.5
Informal votes		1,476	4.7	+1.5
Turnout		31,628	93.8	
Two-party-preferred result
National	Peter Walsh	22,152	73.4	+9.2
Labor	Glenn Morrison	8,029	26.6	−9.2
National hold		Swing	+9.2	

=== Tarneit ===
2006 Victorian state election: Tarneit
Party	Candidate	Votes	%	±%
Labor	Tim Pallas	19,565	53.4	−10.1
Liberal	Mark Rose	10,094	27.6	−0.5
Family First	Chris Harrison	2,339	6.4	+6.4
Greens	Pamela Boyd	2,336	6.4	+6.4
Independent	John Gibbons	1,726	4.7	+4.7
People Power	Michael Goldsworthy	576	1.6	+1.6
Total formal votes		36,636	94.7	−1.6
Informal votes		2,053	5.3	+1.6
Turnout		38,689	93.8	
Two-party-preferred result
Labor	Tim Pallas	22,879	62.5	−4.9
Liberal	Mark Rose	13,747	37.5	+4.9
Labor hold		Swing	−4.9	

=== Thomastown ===
2006 Victorian state election: Thomastown
Party	Candidate	Votes	%	±%
Labor	Peter Batchelor	23,058	74.0	−1.8
Liberal	Simon Coles	4,605	14.8	−1.8
Greens	Jen Hargrave	2,044	6.6	−1.0
Family First	Tim Rebbechi	1,444	4.6	+4.6
Total formal votes		31,151	91.9	−2.5
Informal votes		2,753	8.1	+2.5
Turnout		33,904	93.0	
Two-party-preferred result
Labor	Peter Batchelor	25,152	81.1	−0.6
Liberal	Simon Coles	5,872	18.9	+0.6
Labor hold		Swing	−0.6	

=== Warrandyte ===
2006 Victorian state election: Warrandyte
Party	Candidate	Votes	%	±%
Liberal	Ryan Smith	18,309	50.8	−1.6
Labor	Jarrod Panther	10,519	29.2	−5.8
Greens	David Ellis	5,169	14.3	+4.3
Family First	Paul Bronte	2,042	5.7	+5.7
Total formal votes		36,039	96.7	−0.9
Informal votes		1,228	3.3	+0.9
Turnout		37,267	94.1	
Two-party-preferred result
Liberal	Ryan Smith	21,244	59.0	+2.7
Labor	Jarrod Panther	14,767	41.0	−2.7
Liberal hold		Swing	+2.7	

=== Williamstown ===
2006 Victorian state election: Williamstown
Party	Candidate	Votes	%	±%
Labor	Steve Bracks	20,010	61.7	−2.9
Liberal	Alan Evers-Buckland	6,706	20.7	+1.9
Greens	Michael Faltermaier	4,008	12.4	+2.2
Family First	Veronica Hayes	1,443	4.4	+4.4
Independent	Wajde Assaf	264	0.8	+0.8
Total formal votes		32,431	94.4	−2.2
Informal votes		1,933	5.6	+2.2
Turnout		34,364	91.8	
Two-party-preferred result
Labor	Steve Bracks	24,066	74.3	−1.4
Liberal	Alan Evers-Buckland	8,346	25.7	+1.4
Labor hold		Swing	−1.4	

=== Yan Yean ===
2006 Victorian state election: Yan Yean
Party	Candidate	Votes	%	±%
Labor	Danielle Green	17,751	47.4	−2.1
Liberal	Aneta Ivanovski	12,963	34.6	−3.8
Greens	Karin Geradts	3,586	9.6	−1.3
Family First	Matthew Field	1,295	3.5	+3.5
Independent	Belinda Clarkson	1,119	3.0	+3.0
People Power	Brian Mawhinney	714	1.9	+1.9
Total formal votes		37,428	96.2	−0.9
Informal votes		1,479	3.8	+0.9
Turnout		38,907	94.7	
Two-party-preferred result
Labor	Danielle Green	21,675	57.9	−1.6
Liberal	Aneta Ivanovski	15,753	42.1	+1.6
Labor hold		Swing	−1.6	

=== Yuroke ===
2006 Victorian state election: Yuroke
Party	Candidate	Votes	%	±%
Labor	Liz Beattie	23,531	63.2	−8.1
Liberal	Cathy Finn	8,909	23.9	−2.4
Greens	Belinda Connell	2,814	7.6	+7.6
Family First	George Barrett	1,970	5.3	+5.3
Total formal votes		37,224	95.1	−0.8
Informal votes		1,916	4.9	+0.8
Turnout		39,140	94.3	
Two-party-preferred result
Labor	Liz Beattie	26,126	70.2	−2.7
Liberal	Cathy Finn	11,095	29.8	+2.7
Labor hold		Swing	−2.7	

== See also ==
- 2006 Victorian state election
- Candidates of the 2006 Victorian state election
- Members of the Victorian Legislative Assembly, 2006–2010
