= Candidates of the 2006 Victorian state election =

This article provides details on candidates for the 2006 Victorian election, held on 25 November 2006.

== Retiring MPs ==
=== Labor ===
- Mary Delahunty MLA (Northcote) – announced retirement October 2006.
- Sherryl Garbutt MLA (Bundoora) – retired.
- Mary Gillett MLA (Tarneit) – lost preselection.
- Michael Leighton MLA (Preston) – retired.
- Peter Loney MLA (Lara) – retired after it became clear he would lose preselection.
- Bruce Mildenhall MLA (Footscray) – retired.
- Dale Wilson MLA (Narre Warren South) – lost preselection.
- Helen Buckingham MLC (Koonung Province) – retired due to ill health.
- Monica Gould MLC (Doutta Galla Province) – retired.
- Geoff Hilton MLC (Western Port Province – lost preselection.
- John McQuilten MLC (Ballarat Province) – retired.
- Sang Nguyen MLC (Melbourne West Province) – lost preselection.

=== Liberal ===
- Robin Cooper MLA (Mornington) – retired.
- Robert Doyle MLA (Malvern) – retired.
- Phil Honeywood MLA (Warrandyte) – retired.
- Victor Perton MLA (Doncaster) – retired.
- Tony Plowman MLA (Benambra) – retired.
- Ron Bowden MLC (South Eastern Province) – retired.
- Andrew Brideson MLC (Waverley Province) – retired.
- Bill Forwood MLC (Templestowe Province) – retired.
- Graeme Stoney MLC (Central Highlands Province) – retired.
- Chris Strong MLC (Higinbotham Province) – lost preselection.

=== National ===
- Noel Maughan MLA (Rodney) – retired.
- Barry Bishop MLC (North Western Province) – retired.

=== Independent ===
- Carolyn Hirsh MLC (Silvan Province) – elected as Labor.
- Andrew Olexander MLC (Silvan Province) – elected as Liberal.

== Legislative Assembly ==
Sitting members are shown in bold text. Successful candidates are highlighted in the relevant colour. Where there is possible confusion, an asterisk (*) is also used.

Electorate	Held by	Labor candidates	Liberal candidates	Greens candidates	Family First candidates	National candidates	Other candidates
Albert Park	Labor	**John Thwaites**	Clive Smith	John Middleton	Sam Robertson		Adrian Jackson (Ind); Stratos Pavlis (PP); David Reece (CEC)
Altona	Labor	**Lynne Kosky**	Ian Soylemez	Andreas Bischof	David Bernard		
Ballarat East	Labor	**Geoff Howard**	Geoff Hayes	Michele Harvie	Grace Bailey		Dianne Hadden (Ind)
Ballarat West	Labor	**Karen Overington**	Shane Brennan	Belinda Coates	Dale Butterfield		
Bass	Liberal	John Anderson	**Ken Smith**	Tully Fletcher	Cameron Begg	Jacky Abbott	Cheryl Billing-Smith (Ind); Robert Brown (PP)
Bayswater	Labor	**Peter Lockwood**	Heidi Victoria	James Tennant	Warwick Murphy		Gordon Ashley (Ind); Kurt Beilharz (CEC); Stephanie Mortimer (PP); Steve Raskovy (Ind)
Bellarine	Labor	**Lisa Neville**	Don Gibson	Justin Teague	Len Lengyal		
Benalla	National	Rob Mitchell	Hamish McMillan	Kammy Cordner-Hunt	Jim Reiney	**Bill Sykes**	
Benambra	Liberal	Lisa Mahood	Bill Tilley	Helen Robinson	Martin Corboy	Bill Baxter	Shane Pearce (Ind)
Bendigo East	Labor	**Jacinta Allan**	Kevin Gibbins	John Bardsley	Gail Hardy	John Manning	Colin James (PP)
Bendigo West	Labor	**Bob Cameron**	Bruce McClure	Sue-Ellen Radford	Rachel Harrison	Glenn Murrells	
Bentleigh	Labor	**Rob Hudson**	James Gobbo	Peter D'Arcy	Michael Portelli		Colin Horne (CEC)
Box Hill	Liberal	Robert Chong	**Robert Clark**	Peter Campbell	Gary Ong		Christine Cumming (PP)
Brighton	Liberal	Jane Shelton	**Louise Asher**	Jonathan Walters	Mark Freeman		Clifford Hayes (Ind)
Broadmeadows	Labor	**John Brumby**	Daniel Parsons	Emily Taylor	Gerard Hines		Marlene Ebejer (PP); Will Marshall (Ind); Sleiman Yohanna (CEC)
Brunswick	Labor	**Carlo Carli**	Vince Arborea	Cyndi Dawes	James McDonald		Christian Astorian (PP); Vannessa Hearman (SA)
Bulleen	Liberal	Neill Campbell	**Nicholas Kotsiras**	Fiona MacKenzie	Carmen Tong		
Bundoora	Labor	Colin Brooks	Kane Afford	Sarah Jefford	Dean Cronkwright		Julie Anderson (PP); Rod McLennan (CEC)
Burwood	Labor	**Bob Stensholt**	Graham Bailey	John Presley	John Caravan		
Carrum	Labor	**Jenny Lindell**	Jeff Shelley	Carlos Lopez	Michael McLean		Ronnie Musster (Ind); Alan Thompson (Ind)
Caulfield	Liberal	Steven Cusworth	**Helen Shardey**	Peter Job	Eric Labonne		
Clayton	Labor	**Hong Lim**	Michael Carty	Siobhan Isherwood	Emyr Aditya		Simon Hall (CEC)
Cranbourne	Labor	**Jude Perera**	Luke Martin	Hillary Bray	Mark Hermans		
Dandenong	Labor	**John Pandazopoulos**	Cameron Nicholls	Peter Blair	Peter Dorian		
Derrimut	Labor	**Telmo Languiller**	Charles Tran	Marc Purcell	Margaret Foster		Rod Doel (CEC); Jorge Jorquera (Ind)
Doncaster	Liberal	Lidia Argondizzo	Mary Wooldridge	Chris Gymer	Dot Peak		Irene Goonan (Ind); Graham Wynn (PP)
Eltham	Labor	**Steve Herbert**	Craig Ondarchie	Damien Magner	Shane Porter		
Essendon	Labor	**Judy Maddigan**	Conrad D'Souza	Bob Muntz	Arthur Tsiglopoulos		Jeremy Beck (CEC); Phillip Cutler (Ind)
Evelyn	Labor	**Heather McTaggart**	Christine Fyffe	Justine Indigo-Rose	Roger Williamson		Peter Byrne (PP)
Ferntree Gully	Labor	**Anne Eckstein**	Nick Wakeling	Steve Bullock	Allister Rouse		Adrian Dowell (PP); Ross Russell (CEC)
Footscray	Labor	Marsha Thomson	Cam Nation	Greg Ferrington	Ronald Berchy		Catherine Cumming (Ind); Margarita Windisch (SA)
Forest Hill	Labor	**Kirstie Marshall**	Neil Angus	Mick Kir	Stella Collins		
Frankston	Labor	**Alistair Harkness**	Rochelle McArthur	Wendy Smith	Michael Pleiter		Fletcher Davis (Ind)
Geelong	Labor	**Ian Trezise**	Scott Dixon	Bruce Lindsay	Gary Plumridge		Elsie Teer (PP)
Gembrook	Labor	**Tammy Lobato**	Simon Wildes	Gordon Watson	Peter Gebbing	Peter McConachy	Robyn Allcock (PP); Frank Dean (Ind)
Gippsland East	Independent	Zach Smith	Peter Bommer	Geoff de Jonge	Dean Beveridge	Chris Nixon	Clint Eastwood (Ind); **Craig Ingram*** (Ind)
Gippsland South	National	Steve Boyce	Simon Wilson	Jackie Dargaville	Clare Heath	**Peter Ryan**	Theo Alblas (CEC); Jo McCubbin (Ind)
Hastings	Labor	**Rosy Buchanan**	Neale Burgess	Francine Buckley	Melanie Marcin	Jim King	Stuart Holm (PP)
Hawthorn	Liberal	John McNally	**Ted Baillieu**	Lynda Birch	Veronica Sidhu		
Ivanhoe	Labor	**Craig Langdon**	Maxwell Gratton	Marisa Palmer	Kevin Tan		Jenny Mulholland (Ind)
Keilor	Labor	**George Seitz**	John Clifford	Lisa Asbury	Scott Amberley		
Kew	Liberal	Maree Williams	**Andrew McIntosh**	Emma Henley	Wallis Patterson		John Dobinson (Ind)
Kilsyth	Labor	**Dympna Beard**	David Hodgett	Salore Craig	Gillian Schwab		Patsy Hill (Ind)
Kororoit	Labor	**Andre Haermeyer**	Mick Alexander		Tania Walters		Andre Kozlowski (CEC)
Lara	Labor	John Eren	Angelo Kakouros	Catherine Jones	Peter Haines		Brent Lyons-Lee (PP)
Lowan	National	Paul Battista	Katrina Rainsford	Rob Daly	Graeme Presser	**Hugh Delahunty**	
Lyndhurst	Labor	**Tim Holding**	Gary Anderton	Andrew Henley	Jenny Walsh		Gordon Ford (Ind)
Macedon	Labor	**Joanne Duncan**	Robyne Head	Leigh Johnson	Frank O'Connor		Barry Dave (Ind); Rob Guthrie (PP); Steve Medcraft (Ind)
Malvern	Liberal	Paul Vout	Michael O'Brien	Tania Giles	Ann Grauer		Deborah Holmes (PP)
Melbourne	Labor	**Bronwyn Pike**	Steve Pappas	Richard Di Natale	Rebecca Gebbing		Kevin Chamberlin (Ind); Isabell Collins (PP)
Melton	Labor	**Don Nardella**	Graham Hooper	Jeremy Sanders	Pamela Lee		John Goodman (Ind); John Southall (Ind)
Mildura	Independent	Alison Smith	Gavin Sedgmen	Bruce Rivendell		Peter Crisp	Chris Katis (Ind); **Russell Savage** (Ind)
Mill Park	Labor	**Lily D'Ambrosio**	Adam Papaevangelou	Benedict Hughes	Carmen McLeod		Christine Stow (PP)
Mitcham	Labor	**Tony Robinson**	Philip Daw	Robert Redman	Miriam Rawson		Peter Allan (Ind); Sharon Partridge (PP)
Monbulk	Labor	**James Merlino**	Clive Larkman	Robert Stephen	Carl Huybers		Joanne Stride (PP)
Mordialloc	Labor	**Janice Munt**	Stephen Hartney	Shana Nerenberg	Jadah Milroy		
Mornington	Liberal	William Puls	David Morris	Malcolm Jones	Thea Clarke		Mark Fleming (PP)
Morwell	Labor	**Brendan Jenkins**	Stephen Parker	Jeff Wrathall	Katy Koo	Russell Northe	Lisa Proctor (Ind); Ian Radford (PP)
Mount Waverley	Labor	**Maxine Morand**	Michael Gidley	John Poppins	John Boland		Kali Paxinos (PP); Neil Smith (Ind)
Mulgrave	Labor	**Daniel Andrews**	Ashton Ashokkumar	Jon Owen	Penny Badwal		
Murray Valley	National	Lauren O'Neill	Nick McHugh	Carol Kunert	Gary Duke	**Ken Jasper**	
Narracan	Labor	**Ian Maxfield**	Gary Blackwood	Kate Jackson	Terry McKenna	John Verhoeven	Steven Bird (CEC); Roger Marks (PP)
Narre Warren North	Labor	**Luke Donnellan**	Mick Morland	Bree Taylor	Peterine Smulders		Ian Murphy (PP)
Narre Warren South	Labor	Judith Graley	Michael Shepherdson	Meg Tanti	Bronwyn Rawlins		
Nepean	Liberal	Anne Marshall	**Martin Dixon**	Henry Kelsall	Craig Nelson		
Niddrie	Labor	**Rob Hulls**	James Buonopane	Gwen Lee	Mark Markovic		
Northcote	Labor	Fiona Richardson	Graham Watt	Alex Bhathal	Daniel Willis		Darren Lewin-Hill (Ind)
Oakleigh	Labor	**Ann Barker**	Colin Dixon	Matthew Billman	Joyce Khoo		
Pascoe Vale	Labor	**Christine Campbell**	Claude Tomisich	David Collis	Stefan Pittari		Noelene Isherwood (CEC)
Polwarth	Liberal	Darren Cheeseman	**Terry Mulder**	Natalie Atherden	Trevor Pearce		
Prahran	Labor	**Tony Lupton**	Clem Newton-Brown	Justin Walker	Gary Pinto		
Preston	Labor	Robin Scott	Peter Hammond	Chris Chaplin	Christopher Field		Robert Barwick (CEC)
Richmond	Labor	**Richard Wynne**	Maina Walkley	Gurm Sekhon	Ann Bown Seeley		Richard Grummet (PP); Steve Jolly (Ind); Luke Watts (Ind)
Ripon	Labor	**Joe Helper**	Vic Dunn	Steve Morse	Leanne Rawson	Robyn Smith	
Rodney	National	Nicola Castleman	Neil Repacholi	Beck Lowe	Paul Bachelor	Paul Weller	Tony Murphy (Ind); Jeff Simmons (Ind)
Sandringham	Liberal	Noel Pullen	**Murray Thompson**	Bruce McPhate	Stuart Campbell		Sonia Castelli (Ind)
Scoresby	Liberal	Gerry Raleigh	**Kim Wells**	Rex Thompson	Peter Lake		John Tibble (PP)
Seymour	Labor	**Ben Hardman**	Mike Dalmau	Sean O'Sullivan	Josh Dolan		Robert Gordon (PP)
Shepparton	National	James Taylor	Stephen Merrylees	Doug Ralph	Neil Meyer	**Jeanette Powell**	
South Barwon	Labor	**Michael Crutchfield**	Michael King	Matthew Walters	Jonathan Tinney		John Lambert (Ind)
South-West Coast	Liberal	Roy Reekie	**Denis Napthine**	Phoebe Adams	Barry Wilson	David O'Brien	Mike Noske (PP)
Swan Hill	National	Glenn Morrison	Suellen Tomamichel	Simon Roberts	Martin Jones	**Peter Walsh**	Trudy Campbell (CEC)
Tarneit	Labor	Tim Pallas	Mark Rose	Pamela Boyd	Christopher Harrison		John Gibbons (Ind); Michael Goldsworthy (PP)
Thomastown	Labor	**Peter Batchelor**	Simon Coles	Jen Hargrave	Tim Rebecchi		
Warrandyte	Liberal	Jarrod Panther	Ryan Smith	David Ellis	Paul Bronti		
Williamstown	Labor	**Steve Bracks**	Alan Evers-Buckland	Michael Faltermaier	Veronica Hayes		Wajde Assaf (Ind)
Yan Yean	Labor	**Danielle Green**	Aneta Ivanovski	Karin Geradts	Matthew Field		Belinda Clarkson (Ind); Brian Mawhinney (PP)
Yuroke	Labor	**Liz Beattie**	Catherine Finn	Belinda Connell	George Barrett		

== Legislative Council ==
The 40 members of the Legislative Council were elected under a proportional representation system. Each region elected five members. Sitting members are shown in bold text. Tickets that elected at least one MLC are highlighted in the relevant colour. Successful candidates are identified by an asterisk (*).

=== Eastern Metropolitan ===
Labor candidates	Liberal candidates	Greens candidates	Family First candidates	DLP candidates
1. Shaun Leane*; 2. Brian Tee*; 3. Andrew McKenzie; 4. Coral Delarue; 5. Mike Symon	1. **Richard Dalla-Riva***; 2. **Bruce Atkinson***; 3. Jan Kronberg*; 4. Gladys Liu; 5. Matthew Koce	1. Bill Pemberton; 2. Kiera Perrott; 3. Nina Scott; 4. Howard Tankey; 5. Janet Powell	1. Chris Willis; 2. May Ng; 3. Fiona Bronte; 4. John Bridge; 5. Pat Murray	1. Greg Byrne; 2. Ken Wells
Democrats candidates	People Power candidates			
1. Craig Beale; 2. Mary Dettman; 3. Rachel Aza	1. Karin Orpen; 2. John Giles			

=== Eastern Victoria ===
Labor candidates	Liberal candidates	National candidates	Greens candidates	Family First candidates
1. **Matt Viney***; 2. **Johan Scheffer***; 3. **Glenyys Romanes**; 4. Gregg Cook; 5. Ann Dettrick	1. **Philip Davis***; 2. Edward O'Donohue*; 3. Susie Manson; 4. Sarah Meredith; 5. Daniel Hyland	1. **Peter Hall***; 2. Janice Coates; 3. Wesley Head; 4. Jenny Hammett; 5. Neville Buckland	1. Louis Delacretaz; 2. Jill Redwood; 3. George Beardsley; 4. Catheryn Thompson; 5. Daniel Jordan	1. Cameron Eastman; 2. Joshua Reimer; 3. Wendy Buchanan; 4. Mark Harvey; 5. Marcus van Enik
DLP candidates	People Power candidates	CDP candidates	Country Alliance candidates	Group F candidates
1. Pat Crea; 2. Pat Lamanna; 3. Margaret Hansen; 4. Teresa Evelyn-Liardet	1. Gabriela Byrne; 2. Jodie Hughson	1. Wolfgang Voigt; 2. Eddie Brockhus	1. Andrew Jones; 2. Peter Kelly	1. Henrie Ellis; 2. Stephen Pearman
Ungrouped candidates				
Adnan Glibanovic				

=== Northern Metropolitan ===
Labor candidates	Liberal candidates	Greens candidates	Family First candidates	DLP candidates
1. **Theo Theophanous***; 2. **Jenny Mikakos***; 3. Nazih Elasmar*; 4. Michele Ryan; 5. Joe Caputo	1. Matthew Guy*; 2. Dino de Marchi; 3. Emilia Arnus	1. Greg Barber*; 2. Priya Carey; 3. Hoa Pham; 4. Glenn Osboldstone; 5. Daniel Marti	1. Liz Bos; 2. Amy Shand; 3. Giacomo Angeli; 4. Roy Crea	1. John Mulholland; 2. Kevin Harwood
Democrats candidates	People Power candidates	Group D candidates		
1. Geoff Lutz; 2. Jessica Healy; 3. Robert Stone	1. Barbara Biggs; 2. Vern Hughes	1. Joseph Kaliniy; 2. Koulla Mesaritis; 3. Alexios Alexopoulos; 4. Mousti Senkul		

=== Northern Victoria ===
Labor candidates	Liberal candidates	National candidates	Greens candidates	Family First candidates
1. **Candy Broad***; 2. **Kaye Darveniza***; 3. Marg Lewis; 4. Brad Dobson; 5. Jamie Byron	1. **Wendy Lovell***; 2. Donna Petrovich*; 3. John Lithgow; 4. Zie Devereux; 5. Michael Gillies Smith	1. **Damian Drum***; 2. Rachel McAsey; 3. Justin Scholz; 4. Robert Michell; 5. Brian O'Sullivan	1. Jennifer Alden; 2. Jon Baly; 3. Jenny O'Connor	1. Nathan Hulls; 2. Mary Lou Corboy; 3. Nathanael Valentine; 4. Helen Leach
DLP candidates	People Power candidates	CDP candidates	Country Alliance candidates	Group E candidates
1. Andrew Robinson; 2. Paul McCormack; 3. Sharon Lane	1. Denise Allen; 2. Phil Bachmann	1. Phil Seymour; 2. Ewan McDonald	1. Danny Lee; 2. Fred Goodwin	1. Stefano de Pieri; 2. Helen Healy; 3. Geoff Brown; 4. Joe Rocca; 5. Neil Fettling
Group H candidates				
1. Laurie Whelan; 2. Peter O'Brien				

=== South Eastern Metropolitan ===
Labor candidates	Liberal candidates	Greens candidates	Family First candidates	DLP candidates
1. **Gavin Jennings***; 2. **Adem Somyurek***; 3. **Bob Smith***; 4. Vince Rossi; 5. Shilana Yip	1. **Gordon Rich-Phillips***; 2. Inga Peulich*; 3. Ken Ong; 4. Susanne La Fontaine; 5. John Aivaliotis	1. Jim Reiher; 2. Nicole Avery; 3. Dean Andrew	1. Ann-Marie Hermans; 2. Steven Ashdown; 3. Ann Ross; 4. Annette Blazé	1. Denise de Graaff; 2. Frances Murphy
Democrats candidates	People Power candidates	CDP candidates	Group E candidates	
1. Karen Bailey; 2. David Batten; 3. Daniel Berk	1. Linda Hancock; 2. Maria Pazaitis	1. Sandra Herrmann; 2. Jenny Zuiderwyk	1. Geraldine Gonsalvez; 2. Julie Boustead	

=== Southern Metropolitan ===
Labor candidates	Liberal candidates	Greens candidates	Family First candidates	DLP candidates
1. **John Lenders***; 2. Evan Thornley*; 3. Shelly Freeman; 4. Alexandria Hicks; 5. Pablo Salina	1. **David Davis***; 2. **Andrea Coote***; 3. David Southwick; 4. Michael Heffernan; 5. Kaye Farrow	1. Sue Pennicuik*; 2. Heather Welsh; 3. Ray Walford; 4. Clare Pilcher; 5. Teresa Puszka	1. John McSwiney; 2. John Friebel; 3. Brian Campbell	1. Gerry Flood; 2. Brian Maunder; 3. Terry O'Hanlon
Democrats candidates	People Power candidates	Group C candidates	Ungrouped candidates	
1. Paul Kavanagh; 2. Margaret Mitsikas; 3. John Mathieson	1. Stephen Mayne; 2. Judith Voce	1. Rita Bentley; 2. Geoff Taylor	John Myers	

=== Western Metropolitan ===
Labor candidates	Liberal candidates	Greens candidates	Family First candidates	DLP candidates
1. **Justin Madden***; 2. Khalil Eideh*; 3. Martin Pakula*; 4. Henry Barlow; 5. Lisa Zanatta	1. Bernie Finn*; 2. Stephen Reynolds; 3. Wayne Tseng; 4. Ann Bitans	1. Colleen Hartland*; 2. Nam Bui; 3. Robert Humphreys; 4. Liz Ingham; 5. Nora Tchekmeyan	1. Ashley Alp; 2. Anh Nguyen; 3. Robert Walker; 4. Marie Spataro; 5. Roger San Jose	1. Mark Beshara; 2. Shane McCarthy
Democrats candidates	People Power candidates			
1. Robert Livesay; 2. Danii Coric; 3. Roger Howe	1. Max Jackson; 2. Christine Williams			

=== Western Victoria ===
Labor candidates	Liberal candidates	National candidates	Greens candidates	Family First candidates
1. Jaala Pulford*; 2. Gayle Tierney*; 3. **Elaine Carbines**; 4. Christine Couzens; 5. Chris Papas	1. **John Vogels***; 2. **David Koch***; 3. Kate Bullen; 4. Paul Johnston; 5. John Oxley	1. Samantha McIntosh; 2. Peter McIntyre	1. Marcus Ward; 2. Gillian Blair; 3. Stephen Chenery; 4. Karen McAloon; 5. Judy Cameron	1. Gordon Alderson; 2. Monique Podbury; 3. Michael Croot; 4. Anna Jennings; 5. Michael Albers
DLP candidates	People Power candidates	Socialist candidates	Country Alliance candidates	Ungrouped candidates
1. Peter Kavanagh*; 2. Clare Power; 3. David Power; 4. Michael Casanova; 5. Leanne Casanova	1. Greg Jones; 2. Lachlan Jones	1. Sue Bull; 2. Rowan Stewart	1. Miles Hodge; 2. Ron Heath	John Camilleri

== Preselected candidates who resigned ==
- Jack Reilly resigned as the No 1 People Power candidate for Northern Metropolitan on Saturday 16 September 2006.
- Helen Buckingham resigned as the No 3 ALP candidate for Eastern Metropolitan.
- Mary Delahunty resigned as the ALP incumbent candidate for Northcote.
- Stephen Mayne resigned as the No. 1 People Power candidate for Southern Metropolitan on 18 October 2006, but he reversed this decision on 1 November 2006.
- Wally Rogers resigned as the Liberal candidate for Yuroke due to illness.
- Frank Dawood resigned as the Liberal candidate for Dandenong.
- Andrew Olexander did not nominate after all

== See also ==
- Members of the Victorian Legislative Assembly, 2002-2006
- Members of the Victorian Legislative Council, 2002-2006
- 2006 Victorian state election
- Results of the Victorian state election, 2006
