= Results and maps of the 2006 Victorian state election =

== Total result for Legislative Assembly ==
2006 Victorian state election Legislative Assembly << 2002–2010 >>
Enrolled voters	3,353,845				
Votes cast	3,109,907		Turnout	92.73	–0.43
Informal votes	141,914		Informal	4.56	+1.14
Summary of votes by party
Party	Primary votes	%	Swing	Seats	Change
Labor	1,278,046	43.06	–4.89	55	–7
Liberal	1,022,110	34.44	+0.53	23	+6
Greens	297,931	10.04	+0.31	0	±0
National	153,299	5.17	+0.87	9	+2
Family First	127,266	4.29	+4.29	0	±0
People Power	15,226	0.51	+0.51	0	±0
Citizens Electoral Council	5,187	0.17	–0.16	0	±0
Socialist Alliance	1,102	0.04	–0.07	0	±0
Other	67,826	2.29	–1.11	1	–1
Total	2,967,993			88	
Two-party-preferred
Labor	1,611,866	54.38	–3.38		
Liberal	1,352,258	45.62	+3.38		

=== Maps ===
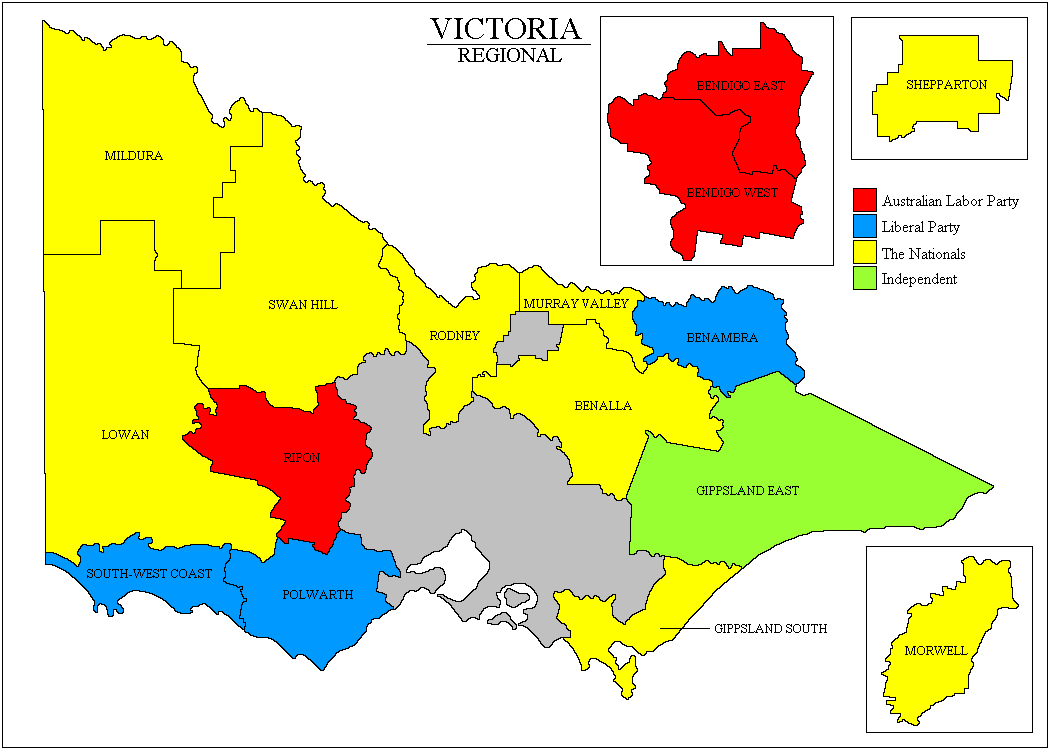

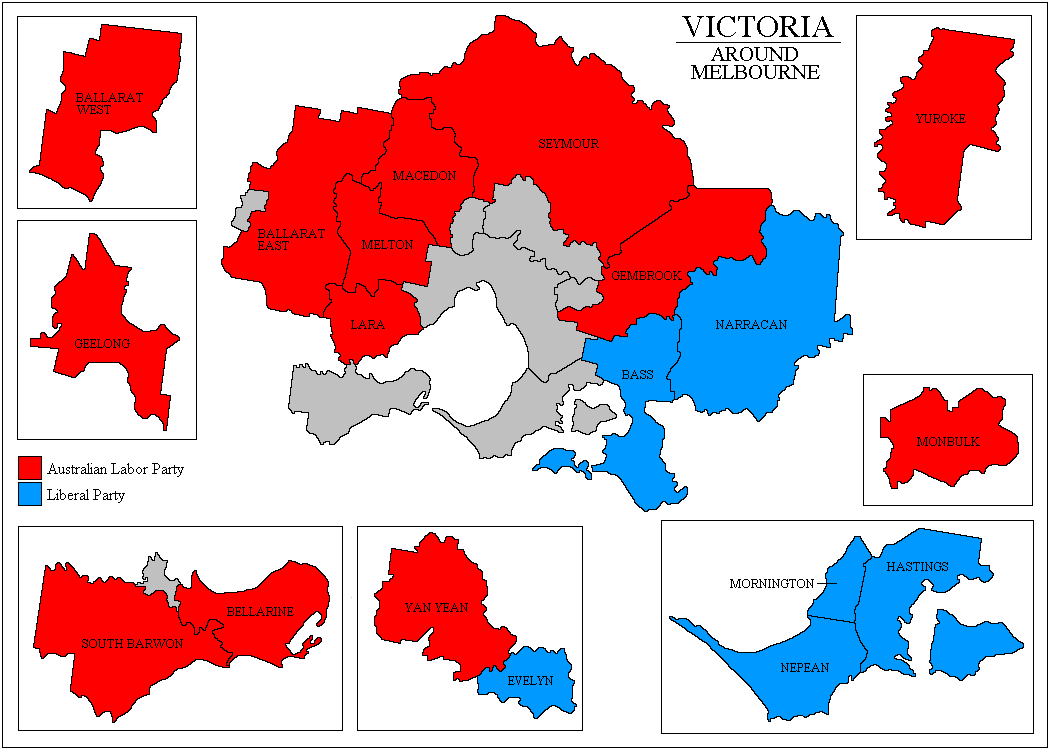

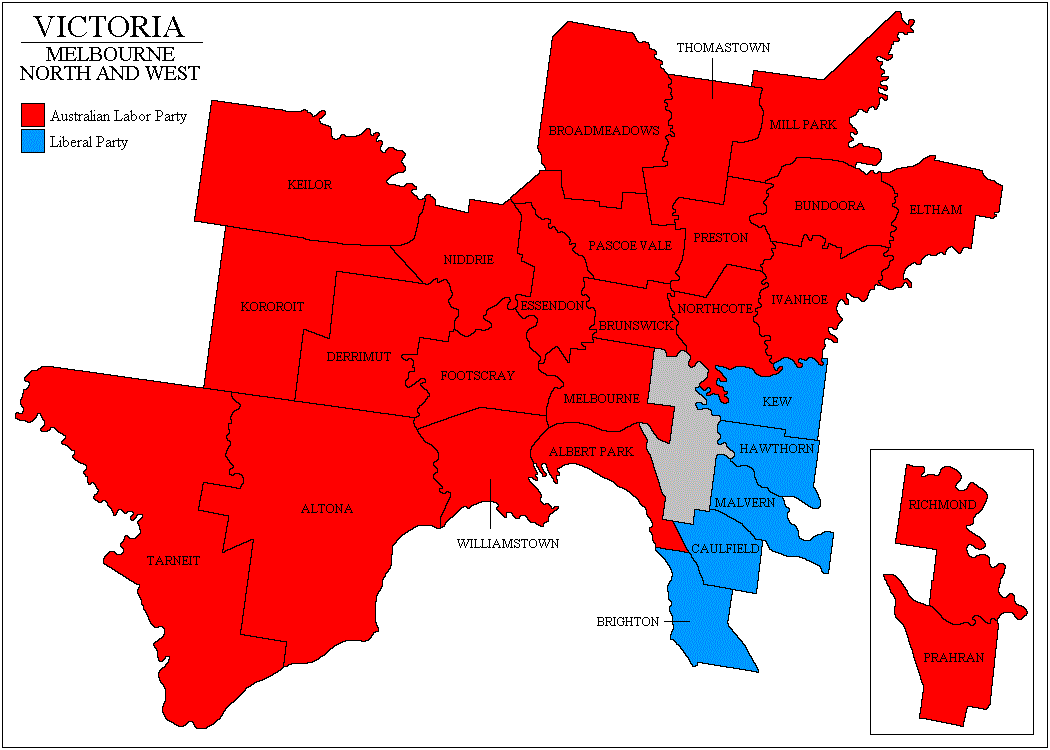

== Total result for Legislative Council ==
Votes cast	3,110,172	Turnout	92.73%
Informal votes	133,243	Informal %	4.28%
Party	Primary votes	%	Seats
Labor Party	1,234,082	41.45%	19
Liberal Party	1,028,421	34.55%	15
Greens	314,847	10.58%	3
National Party	131,946	4.43%	2
Family First	114,739	3.85%	0
Democratic Labor Party	58,722	1.97%	1
Other candidates	94,172	3.17%	0
Total	2,976,929		40

Parties represented under the category "Other candidates" include:

- People Power Party - 1.02%
- Australian Democrats - 0.83%
- Country Alliance - 0.45%
- Christian Democratic Party - 0.2%
- Socialist Alliance - 0.04%
- Independent candidates - 0.63%

== Electoral Districts and Regions ==
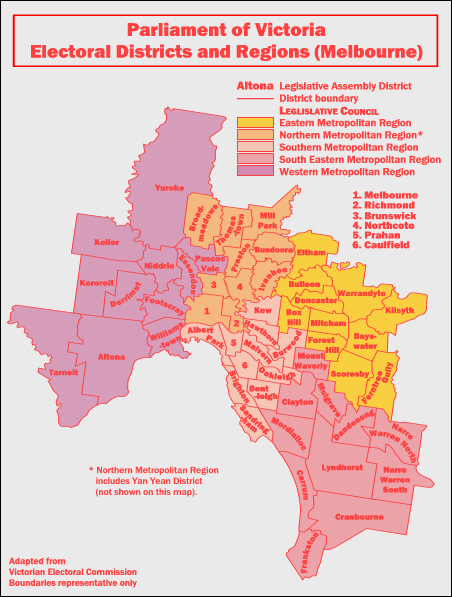
This map shows the lower house districts covering metropolitan Melbourne. The districts are grouped to form five upper house regions.

This map shows the lower house districts covering regional Victoria. The districts are each grouped to form three upper house regions.

== Legislative Assembly results by District ==
Composition of the Legislative Assembly of the 55th Parliament of Victoria					2006 result
District	Sitting member	Political party	Margin	Status	Retain/gain	Swing	Person elected
Albert Park	John Thwaites	ALP	4.80%	Fairly safe	retain	-2.8%	John Thwaites
Altona	Lynne Kosky	ALP	24.70%	Very safe	retain	-4.5%	Lynne Kosky
Ballarat East	Geoff Howard	ALP	7.62%	Safe	retain	-0.9%	Geoff Howard
Ballarat West	Karen Overington	ALP	9.01%	Safe	retain	-1.0%	Karen Overington
Bass	Ken Smith)	Liberal	0.65%	Marginal	retain	+4.9%	Ken Smith
Bayswater	Peter Lockwood	ALP	2.75%	Marginal	gain	-5.6%	Heidi Victoria
Bellarine	Lisa Neville	ALP	8.26%	Safe	retain	-0.3%	Lisa Neville
Benalla	Bill Sykes	National	1.98%	Marginal	retain	+15.5%	Bill Sykes
Benambra	Tony Plowman	Liberal	4.04%	Fairly safe	retain	+3.7%	Bill Tilley
Bendigo East	Jacinta Allan	ALP	12.97%	Safe	retain	-7.7%	Jacinta Allan
Bendigo West	Bob Cameron	ALP	15.95%	Safe	retain	-5.3%	Bob Cameron
Bentleigh	Rob Hudson	ALP	4.75%	Fairly safe	retain	+1.6%	Rob Hudson
Box Hill	Robert Clark	Liberal	1.10%	Marginal	retain	+4.1%	Robert Clark
Brighton	Louise Asher	Liberal	7.42%	Safe	retain	+3.5%	Louise Asher
Broadmeadows	John Brumby	ALP	30.79%	Very safe	retain	+1.4%	John Brumby
Brunswick	Carlo Carli	ALP	9.30%	Safe	retain	-4.7%	Carlo Carli
Bulleen	Nicholas Kotsiras	Liberal	2.65%	Marginal	retain	+5.8%	Nicholas Kotsiras
Bundoora	Sherryl Garbutt	ALP	17.58%	Safe	retain	-2.5%	Colin Brooks
Burwood	Bob Stensholt	ALP	5.10%	Fairly safe	retain	-1.4%	Bob Stensholt
Carrum	Jenny Lindell	ALP	12.17%	Safe	retain	-5.5%	Jenny Lindell
Caulfield	Helen Shardey	Liberal	2.26%	Marginal	retain	+5.3%	Helen Shardey
Clayton	Hong Lim	ALP	23.85%	Very safe	retain	-3.5%	Hong Lim
Cranbourne	Jude Perera	ALP	10.80%	Safe	retain	+0.5%	Jude Perera
Dandenong	John Pandazopoulos	ALP	20.32%	Very safe	retain	-1.6%	John Pandazopoulos
Derrimut	Telmo Languiller	ALP	27.31%	Very safe	retain	-3.0%	Telmo Languiller
Doncaster	Victor Perton	Liberal	0.78%	Marginal	retain	+7.3%	Mary Wooldridge
Eltham	Steve Herbert	ALP	4.80%	Fairly safe	retain	+1.7%	Steve Herbert
Essendon	Judy Maddigan	ALP	15.92%	Safe	retain	-4.2%	Judy Maddigan
Evelyn	Heather McTaggart	ALP	0.34%	Very marginal	gain	-3.1%	Christine Fyffe
Ferntree Gully	Anne Eckstein	ALP	2.29%	Marginal	gain	-2.3%	Nick Wakeling
Footscray	Bruce Mildenhall	ALP	24.91%	Very safe	retain	-0.3%	Marsha Thomson
Forest Hill	Kirstie Marshall	ALP	5.79%	Fairly safe	retain	-5.0%	Kirstie Marshall
Frankston	Alistair Harkness	ALP	5.78%	Fairly safe	retain	-2.6%	Alistair Harkness
Geelong	Ian Trezise	ALP	8.11%	Safe	retain	+0.2%	Ian Trezise
Gembrook	Tammy Lobato	ALP	1.59%	Marginal	retain	-0.9%	Tammy Lobato
Gippsland East	Craig Ingram	Independent	11.75%	Safe	retain	-2.6%	Craig Ingram
Gippsland South	Peter Ryan	National	10.86%	Safe	retain	+5.0%	Peter Ryan
Hastings	Rosy Buchanan	ALP	0.86%	Marginal	gain	-1.8%	Neale Burgess
Hawthorn	Ted Baillieu	Liberal	5.89%	Fairly safe	retain	+6.4%	Ted Baillieu
Ivanhoe	Craig Langdon	ALP	12.50%	Safe	retain	-2.0%	Craig Langdon
Keilor	George Seitz	ALP	18.05%	Safe	retain	+1.4%	George Seitz
Kew	Andrew McIntosh	Liberal	5.99%	Fairly safe	retain	+3.6%	Andrew McIntosh
Kilsyth	Dympna Beard	ALP	2.10%	Marginal	gain	-2.4%	David Hodgett
Kororoit	Andre Haermeyer	ALP	27.06%	Very safe	retain	-1.4%	Andre Haermeyer
Lara	Peter Loney	ALP	22.35%	Very safe	retain	-4.4%	John Eren
Lowan	Hugh Delahunty	National	17.09%	Safe	retain	+5.0%	Hugh Delahunty
Lyndhurst	Tim Holding	ALP	25.09%	Very safe	retain	-3.6%	Tim Holding
Macedon	Joanne Duncan	ALP	9.26%	Safe	retain	-1.0%	Joanne Duncan
Malvern	Robert Doyle	Liberal	10.19%	Safe	retain	+2.1%	Michael O’Brien
Melbourne	Bronwyn Pike	ALP	1.93%	Marginal	retain	+0.1%	Bronwyn Pike
Melton	Don Nardella	ALP	15.33%	Safe	retain	-1.8%	Don Nardella
Mildura	Russell Savage	Independent	18.46%	Safe	gain	-24.6%	Peter Crisp
Mill Park	Lily D'Ambrosio	ALP	26.79%	Safe	retain	-6.0%	Lily D'Ambrosio
Mitcham	Tony Robinson	ALP	7.69%	Fairly safe	retain	-5.7%	Tony Robinson
Monbulk	James Merlino	ALP	8.27%	Safe	retain	-1.6%	James Merlino
Mordialloc	Janice Munt	ALP	4.54%	Fairly safe	retain	-1.0%	Janice Munt
Mornington	Robin Cooper	Liberal	1.83%	Marginal	retain	+10.1%	David Morris
Morwell	Brendan Jenkins	ALP	4.87%	Fairly safe	gain	-7.0%	Russell Northe
Mount Waverley	Maxine Morand	ALP	2.30%	Marginal	retain	-2.0%	Maxine Morand
Mulgrave	Daniel Andrews	ALP	16.23%	Safe	retain	-0.4%	Daniel Andrews
Murray Valley	Ken Jasper	National	13.90%	Safe	retain	+7.9%	Ken Jasper
Narracan	Ian Maxfield	ALP	6.83%	Fairly safe	gain	-9.5%	Gary Blackwood
Narre Warren North	Luke Donnellan	ALP	9.71%	Safe	retain	-0.5%	Luke Donnellan
Narre Warren South	Dale Wilson	ALP	12.61%	Safe	retain	-1.7%	Judith Graley
Nepean	Martin Dixon	Liberal	0.18%	Very marginal	retain	+9.2%	Martin Dixon
Niddrie	Rob Hulls	ALP	16.61%	Safe	retain	-5.4%	Rob Hulls
Northcote	Mary Delahunty	ALP	7.91%	Fairly safe	retain	+0.6%	Fiona Richardson
Oakleigh	Ann Barker	ALP	15.22%	Safe	retain	-2.8%	Ann Barker
Pascoe Vale	Christine Campbell	ALP	24.21%	Very safe	retain	-1.4%	Christine Campbell
Polwarth	Terry Mulder	Liberal	9.54%	Safe	retain	+1.2%	Terry Mulder
Prahran	Tony Lupton	ALP	4.43%	Fairly safe	retain	-0.8%	Tony Lupton
Preston	Michael Leighton	ALP	25.76%	Very safe	retain	-0.5%	Robin Scott
Richmond	Richard Wynne	ALP	3.10%	Marginal	retain	+0.5	Richard Wynne
Ripon	Joe Helper	ALP	7.44%	Safe	retain	-3.1%	Joe Helper
Rodney	Noel Maughan	National	9.96%	Safe	retain	-5.6%	Paul Weller
Sandringham	Murray Thompson	Liberal	3.04%	Marginal	retain	+5.7%	Murray Thompson
Scoresby	Kim Wells	Liberal	3.33%	Marginal	retain	+7.9%	Kim Wells
Seymour	Ben Hardman	ALP	9.50%	Safe	retain	-2.8%	Ben Hardman
Shepparton	Jeanette Powell	National	4.28%	Marginal	retain	+12.4%	Jeanette Powell
South Barwon	Michael Crutchfield	ALP	5.02%	Fairly safe	retain	-2.7%	Michael Crutchfield
South-West Coast	Denis Napthine	Liberal	0.75%	Very marginal	retain	-3.3%	Denis Napthine
Swan Hill	Peter Walsh	National	14.16%	Safe	retain	+12.5%	Peter Walsh
Tarneit	Mary Gillett	ALP	17.41%	Safe	retain	-4.9%	Tim Pallas
Thomastown	Peter Batchelor	ALP	31.75%	Very safe	retain	-0.6%	Peter Batchelor
Warrandyte	Phil Honeywood	Liberal	6.36%	Fairly safe	retain	+2.6%	Ryan Smith
Williamstown	Steve Bracks	ALP	25.72%	Very safe	retain	-1.4%	Steve Bracks
Yan Yean	Danielle Green	ALP	9.54%	Safe	retain	-1.6%	Danielle Green
Yuroke	Liz Beattie	ALP	22.89%	Very safe	retain	-2.7%	Liz Beattie
Source: Victorian Electoral Commission

== Legislative Council results by Region ==
Upper house seat outcome of the 2006 Victorian state election

=== Eastern Metropolitan Region ===
Votes cast	388,126		Turnout	93.99%
Informal votes	12,179		Informal %	3.14%
Party	Primary votes	%	Quotas	Seats
Labor Party	135,264	35.98%	2.1619	2
Liberal Party	168,583	44.84%	2.6905	3
Greens	39,587	10.53%	0.6318	0
Family First Party	16,670	4.43%	0.2660	0
Australian Democrats	5,225	1.39%	0.834	0
Other	10,618	2.82%	0.169	-
Total	375,947			5

Elected MPs:

- 1st elected: Richard Dalla-Riva (Liberal)
- 2nd elected: Shaun Leane (Labor)
- 3rd elected: Bruce Atkinson (Liberal)
- 4th elected: Brian Tee (Labor)
- 5th elected: Jan Kronberg (Liberal)

Candidates from the Democratic Labor Party and the People Power Party also ran for the Eastern Metropolitan Region.

=== Eastern Victoria Region ===
Votes cast	391,826		Turnout	93.81%
Informal votes	12,625		Informal %	3.22%
Party	Primary votes	%	Quotas	Seats
Labor Party	132,334	34.90%	2.094	2
Liberal Party	148,734	39.22%	2.353	2
National Party	32,623	8.60%	0.516	1
Greens	34,745	9.16%	0.550	0
Family First Party	16,895	4.46%	0.267	0
Other	13,870	3.66%	0.220	0
Total	379,201			5

Elected MPs:

- 1st elected: Philip Davis (Liberal)
- 2nd elected: Matt Viney (Labor)
- 3rd elected: Edward O'Donohue (Liberal)
- 4th elected: Johan Scheffer (Labor)
- 5th elected: Peter Hall (Nationals)

Candidates from: the Democratic Labor Party, the People Power Party, the Country Alliance and the Christian Democratic Party also ran for the Eastern Victoria Region, as did independent candidates.

=== Northern Metropolitan Region ===
Votes cast	381,879		Turnout	91.12%
Informal votes	21,730		Informal %	5.69%
Party	Primary votes	%	Quotas	Seats
Labor Party	176,303	48.95%	2.937	3
Liberal Party	83,634	23.22%	1.393	1
Greens	61,465	17.07%	1.024	1
Family First Party	10,117	2.81%	0.169	0
Australian Democrats	4,521	1.26%	0.075	0
Other	24,109	6.69%	0.402	0
Total	360,149			5

Elected MPs:

- 1st elected: Theo Theophanous (Labor)
- 2nd elected: Matthew Guy (Liberal)
- 3rd elected: Jenny Mikakos (Labor)
- 4th elected: Greg Barber (Greens)
- 5th elected: Nazih Elasmar (Labor)

Candidates from the Democratic Labor Party and the People Power Party also ran for the Northern Metropolitan Region, as did independent candidates.

=== Northern Victoria Region ===
Votes cast	380,817		Turnout	93.33%
Informal votes	15,426		Informal %	4.05%
Party	Primary votes	%	Quotas	Seats
Labor Party	110,015	30.11%	1.807	2
Liberal Party	106,483	29.15%	1.749	2
National Party	77,421	21.19%	1.271	1
Greens	26,603	7.28%	0.437	0
Family First Party	13,381	3.66%	0.220	0
Other	31,440	8.61%	0.516	0
Total	365,343			5

Elected MPs:

- 1st elected: Candy Broad (Labor)
- 2nd elected: Wendy Lovell (Liberal)
- 3rd elected: Damian Drum (Nationals)
- 4th elected: Donna Petrovich (Liberal)
- 5th elected: Kaye Darveniza (Labor)

Candidates from: the Democratic Labor Party, the Country Alliance, the People Power Party and the Christian Democratic Party also ran for the Northern Victoria Region, as did independent candidates.

=== Southern Metropolitan Region ===
Votes cast	373,225		Turnout	90.24%
Informal votes	11,420		Informal %	3.06%
Party	Primary votes	%	Quotas	Seats
Labor Party	112,762	31.17%	1.870	2
Liberal Party	167,202	46.21%	2.773	2
Greens	56,816	15.70%	0.942	1
Family First Party	7,894	2.18%	0.131	0
Australian Democrats	6,219	1.72%	0.103	0
Other	10,912	3.02%	0.181	0
Total	361,805			5

Elected MPs:

- 1st elected: David Davis (Liberal)
- 2nd elected: John Lenders (Labor)
- 3rd elected: Andrea Coote (Liberal)
- 4th elected: Sue Pennicuik (Greens)
- 5th elected: Evan Thornley (Labor)

Candidates from the People Power Party and the Democratic Labor Party also ran for the Southern Metropolitan Region, as did independent candidates.

=== South Eastern Metropolitan Region ===
Votes cast	385,747		Turnout	93.41%
Informal votes	20,200		Informal %	5.24%
Party	Primary votes	%	Quotas	Seats
Labor Party	181,986	49.78%	2.987	3
Liberal Party	123,067	33.67%	2.020	2
Greens	26,408	7.22%	0.434	0
Family First Party	19,238	5.26%	0.316	0
Australian Democrats	4,967	1.36%	0.812	0
Other	9,881	2.70%	0.162	0
Total	365,547			5

Elected MPs:

- 1st elected: Gavin Jennings (Labor)
- 2nd elected: Gordon Rich-Phillips (Liberal)
- 3rd elected: Adem Somyurek (Labor)
- 4th elected: Inga Peulich (Liberal)
- 5th elected: Bob Smith (Labor)

Candidates from: the Democratic Labor Party, the People Power Party and the Christian Democratic Party also ran for the South Eastern Metropolitan Region, as did independent candidates.

=== Western Metropolitan Region ===
Votes cast	399,486		Turnout	92.51%
Informal votes	25,075		Informal %	6.28
Party	Primary votes	%	Quotas	Seats
Labor Party	219,706	58.68%	3.521	3
Liberal Party	91,604	24.47%	1.468	1
Greens	35,201	9.40%	0.564	1
Family First Party	15,032	4.01%	0.241	0
Australian Democrats	3,741	1.00%	0.060	0
Other	9,127	2.44%	0.146	0
Total	374,411			5

Elected MPs:

- 1st elected: Justin Madden (Labor)
- 2nd elected: Bernie Finn (Liberal)
- 3rd elected: Khalil Eideh (Labor)
- 4th elected: Martin Pakula (Labor)
- 5th elected: Colleen Hartland (Greens)

Candidates from the Democratic Labor Party and the People Power Party also ran for the Western Metropolitan Region.

=== Western Victoria Region ===
Votes cast	409,066		Turnout	93.46%
Informal votes	14,588		Informal %	3.57%
Party	Primary votes	%	Quotas	Seats
Labor Party	165,712	42.01%	2.520	2
Liberal Party	139,114	35.27%	2.116	2
National Party	21,902	5.55%	0.333	0
Greens	34,022	8.62%	0.518	0
Democratic Labor Party	10,485	2.66%	0.160	1
Other	23,243	5.90%	0.354	0
Total	394,478			5

Elected MPs

- 1st elected: Jaala Pulford (Labor)
- 2nd elected: John Vogels (Liberal)
- 3rd elected: Gayle Tierney (Labor)
- 4th elected: David Koch (Liberal)
- 5th elected: Peter Kavanagh (DLP)

Candidates from the Family First Party, the Country Alliance, the People Power Party and the Socialist Alliance also ran for the Western Victoria Region, as did independent candidates.
