= Electoral results for the district of Kilsyth =

Australian district election results

This is a list of electoral results for the Electoral district of Kilsyth in Victorian state elections.

== Members for Kilsyth ==
Member	Party	Term
Dympna Beard	Labor	2002–2006
David Hodgett	Liberal	2006–2014

== Election results ==
=== Elections in the 2010s ===
2010 Victorian state election: Kilsyth
Party	Candidate	Votes	%	±%
Liberal	David Hodgett	19,348	52.85	+9.23
Labor	Vicki Setches	11,172	30.52	−8.37
Greens	Justin-Paul Sammons	2,913	7.96	−0.66
Family First	Daniel Harrison	1,165	3.18	−3.56
Sex Party	Sam Haughton-Greene	1,145	3.13	+3.13
Independent	Shane McKenzie	546	1.49	+1.49
Democratic Labor	Reinhard Dekter	319	0.87	+0.87
Total formal votes		36,608	95.45	−0.63
Informal votes		1,744	4.55	+0.63
Turnout		38,352	94.40	+0.48
Two-party-preferred result
Liberal	David Hodgett	22,122	60.40	+10.13
Labor	Vicki Setches	14,503	39.60	−10.13
Liberal hold		Swing	+10.13	

=== Elections in the 2000s ===
2006 Victorian state election: Kilsyth
Party	Candidate	Votes	%	±%
Liberal	David Hodgett	15,097	43.6	−1.4
Labor	Dympna Beard	13,458	38.9	−5.9
Greens	Salore Craig	2,982	8.6	−1.6
Family First	Gillian Schwab	2,332	6.7	+6.7
Independent	Patsy Hill	742	2.1	+2.1
Total formal votes		34,611	96.1	−1.0
Informal votes		1,412	3.9	+1.0
Turnout		36,023	93.9	
Two-party-preferred result
Liberal	David Hodgett	17,428	50.4	+2.5
Labor	Dympna Beard	17,183	49.6	−2.5
Liberal gain from Labor		Swing	+2.5	

2002 Victorian state election: Kilsyth
Party	Candidate	Votes	%	±%
Liberal	Lorraine Elliott	15,320	45.0	−12.0
Labor	Dympna Beard	15,256	44.8	+4.0
Greens	Lorraine Leach	3,455	10.2	+9.9
Total formal votes		34,031	97.1	−0.3
Informal votes		1,009	2.9	+0.3
Turnout		35,040	92.7	
Two-party-preferred result
Labor	Dympna Beard	17,726	52.1	+10.0
Liberal	Lorraine Elliott	16,305	47.9	−10.0
Labor gain from Liberal		Swing	+10.0	
