= Electoral results for the district of Keilor =

Victoria, Australia, district election results

This is a list of electoral results for the Electoral district of Keilor in Victorian state elections.

== Members for Keilor ==
Member	Party	Term
Jack Ginifer	Labor	1976–1982
George Seitz	Labor	1982–2010
Natalie Hutchins	Labor	2010–2014

== Election results ==
=== Elections in the 2010s ===
2010 Victorian state election: Keilor
Party	Candidate	Votes	%	±%
Labor	Natalie Hutchins	22,943	49.84	−8.61
Liberal	Damon Ryder	14,367	31.21	+6.32
Greens	Lisa Asbury	3,625	7.88	−0.58
Family First	Scott Amberley	2,627	5.71	−2.49
Independent	Harpreet Walia	2,468	5.36	+5.36
Total formal votes		46,030	92.93	−0.78
Informal votes		3,502	7.07	+0.78
Turnout		49,532	93.72	−0.12
Two-party-preferred result
Labor	Natalie Hutchins	27,788	60.33	−9.08
Liberal	Damon Ryder	18,269	39.67	+9.08
Labor hold		Swing	−9.08	

=== Elections in the 2000s ===
2006 Victorian state election: Keilor
Party	Candidate	Votes	%	±%
Labor	George Seitz	23,674	58.5	−5.0
Liberal	John Clifford	10,081	24.9	−4.1
Greens	Lisa Asbury	3,427	8.5	+0.9
Family First	Scott Amberley	3,321	8.2	+8.2
Total formal votes		40,503	93.7	−1.8
Informal votes		2,718	6.3	+1.8
Turnout		43,221	93.8	
Two-party-preferred result
Labor	George Seitz	28,107	69.4	+1.4
Liberal	John Clifford	12,385	30.6	−1.4
Labor hold		Swing	+1.4	

2002 Victorian state election: Keilor
Party	Candidate	Votes	%	±%
Labor	George Seitz	21,952	63.4	+8.8
Liberal	Darren Buller	10,061	29.0	−11.2
Greens	Steve Nosal	2,628	7.6	+7.6
Total formal votes		34,641	95.5	−0.4
Informal votes		1,620	4.5	+0.4
Turnout		36,261	95.5	
Two-party-preferred result
Labor	George Seitz	23,566	68.0	+11.2
Liberal	Darren Buller	11,071	32.0	−11.2
Labor hold		Swing	+11.2	

=== Elections in the 1990s ===
1999 Victorian state election: Keilor
Party	Candidate	Votes	%	±%
Labor	George Seitz	22,338	58.7	−0.3
Liberal	Joe Fenech	12,851	33.8	−3.5
Independent	Heather Burns	2,875	7.6	+7.6
Total formal votes		38,064	95.1	−0.7
Informal votes		1,967	4.9	+0.7
Turnout		40,031	95.1	
Two-party-preferred result
Labor	George Seitz	23,529	61.9	+0.3
Liberal	Joe Fenech	14,481	38.1	−0.3
Labor hold		Swing	+0.3	

1996 Victorian state election: Keilor
Party	Candidate	Votes	%	±%
Labor	George Seitz	20,290	58.9	+6.2
Liberal	Nicholas Kosenko	12,833	37.3	+0.3
Independent	Abe Chahrouk	1,302	3.8	+3.8
Total formal votes		34,425	95.8	+1.4
Informal votes		1,512	4.2	−1.4
Turnout		35,937	94.2	
Two-party-preferred result
Labor	George Seitz	21,186	61.6	+2.7
Liberal	Nicholas Kosenko	13,226	38.4	−2.7
Labor hold		Swing	+2.7	

1992 Victorian state election: Keilor
Party	Candidate	Votes	%	±%
Labor	George Seitz	16,154	52.8	−4.9
Liberal	Stephen Carter	11,319	37.0	+3.4
Independent	Vanessa Wheeler	2,114	6.9	+6.9
Independent	Jim Miller	1,032	3.4	+3.4
Total formal votes		30,619	94.4	+2.4
Informal votes		1,809	5.6	−2.4
Turnout		32,428	95.5	
Two-party-preferred result
Labor	George Seitz	18,015	58.9	−1.6
Liberal	Stephen Carter	12,548	41.1	+1.6
Labor hold		Swing	−1.6	

=== Elections in the 1980s ===
1988 Victorian state election: Keilor
Party	Candidate	Votes	%	±%
Labor	George Seitz	18,601	57.86	−3.60
Liberal	Chris Dimitrijevic	11,346	35.30	−3.24
Democratic Labor	Shane McCarthy	1,274	3.96	+3.96
Independent	Charles Campagnac	925	2.88	+2.88
Total formal votes		32,146	94.22	−2.35
Informal votes		1,972	5.78	+2.35
Turnout		34,118	92.34	−2.13
Two-party-preferred result
Labor	George Seitz	19,726	61.39	−0.07
Liberal	Chris Dimitrijevic	12,404	38.61	+0.07
Labor hold		Swing	−0.07	

1985 Victorian state election: Keilor
Party	Candidate	Votes	%	±%
Labor	George Seitz	16,636	61.5	−5.4
Liberal	Graham Andersen	10,432	38.5	+8.2
Total formal votes		27,068	96.6	
Informal votes		962	3.4	
Turnout		28,030	94.5	
Labor hold		Swing	−7.5	

1982 Keilor state by-election
Party	Candidate	Votes	%	±%
Labor	George Seitz	22,476	65.0	−7.1
Liberal	Graeme Robertson	9,991	28.9	+1.0
Australia	David Anderson	1,756	5.1	+5.1
Independent	Ian MacKechnie	377	1.1	+1.1
Total formal votes		34,600	94.4	+0.1
Informal votes		2,065	5.6	−0.1
Turnout		36,665	82.1	−12.8
Two-party-preferred result
Labor	George Seitz		68.0	−4.1
Liberal	Graeme Robertson		32.0	+4.1
Labor hold		Swing	−4.1	

1982 Victorian state election: Keilor
Party	Candidate	Votes	%	±%
Labor	Jack Ginifer	27,955	72.1	+6.9
Liberal	Graham Robertson	10,822	27.9	−6.9
Total formal votes		38,777	94.3	+0.3
Informal votes		2,345	5.7	−0.3
Turnout		41,122	94.9	+0.7
Labor hold		Swing	+6.9	

=== Elections in the 1970s ===
1979 Victorian state election: Keilor
Party	Candidate	Votes	%	±%
Labor	Jack Ginifer	20,648	65.2	+7.0
Liberal	Vaclav Ubl	11,006	34.8	−4.6
Total formal votes		31,654	94.0	−1.3
Informal votes		2,036	6.0	+1.3
Turnout		33,690	94.2	+1.3
Labor hold		Swing	+5.0	

1976 Victorian state election: Keilor
Party	Candidate	Votes	%	±%
Labor	Jack Ginifer	14,914	58.2	+1.3
Liberal	Vaclav Ubl	10,112	39.4	+6.5
Independent	Spyros Kokkinos	604	2.4	+2.4
Total formal votes		25,630	95.3	
Informal votes		1,273	4.7	
Turnout		26,903	92.9	
Two-party-preferred result
Labor	Jack Ginifer	15,418	60.2	+2.1
Liberal	Vaclav Ubl	10,212	39.8	−2.1
Labor hold		Swing	+2.1	
