= Philip Mayne =

British Army officer (1899–2007)

Philip Mayne (22 November 1899 – 9 April 2007) was an English centenarian who was thought to have been the last surviving British officer of the First World War until his death at 107. He is also thought to have been the oldest surviving alumnus of Christ's Hospital, of the University of Cambridge Engineering Department, of King's College, Cambridge and indeed of the whole University of Cambridge.

Mayne was born in Hampstead. His father was a caterer. He won a scholarship to Christ's Hospital and then to King's College, Cambridge, but the First World War intervened.

Mayne became a cadet in the Royal Engineers and was commissioned as a second lieutenant in September 1918. Attending a training camp in Wales, he caught the Spanish flu, and was not fit to be sent to the front before the war ended. Mayne was demobilised on 24 December 1918, and attended Cambridge University from January 1919, having missed only the first term of his first year.

He studied mathematics and then mechanical, electrical and civil engineering. Mayne graduated in 1921 and joined the electrical department of the National Physical Laboratory. He moved to Imperial Chemical Industries in Billingham in 1924. Mayne worked in a reserved occupation in the Second World War, making chemicals for explosives. He rose to the position of technical director before he retired in 1961.

Mayne attributed his longevity to a healthy lifestyle claiming that "I have never had too much to drink and have always cycled, swum and gardened".

He died peacefully in his sleep in Richmond, North Yorkshire on 9 April 2007, aged 107.

Mayne was survived by his three children, eight grandchildren and 21 great-grandchildren. He was the paternal grandfather of Australian journalist Stephen Mayne.
