= Stephen Mayne =

Australian writer, councillor, and shareholder activist

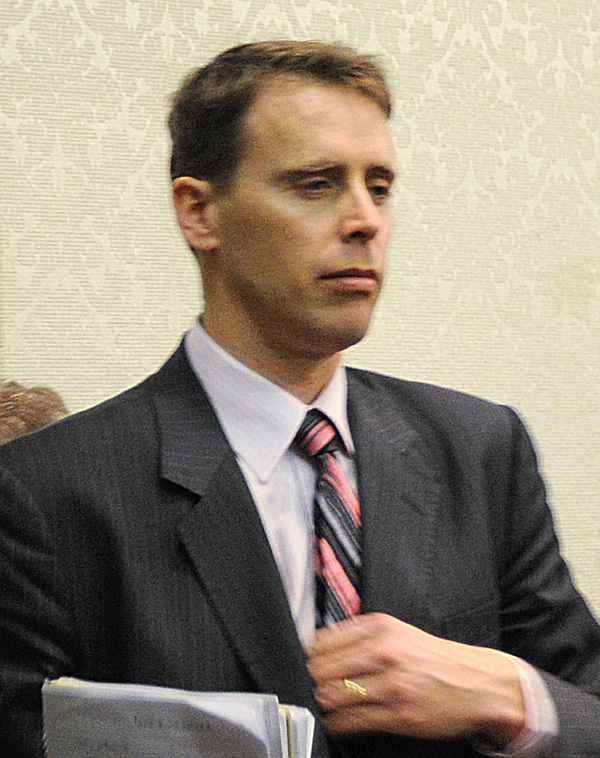
- Mayne, pictured in July 2010

Councillor of the City of Manningham
- Incumbent
- Assumed office 2020
- Ward: Ruffey
- In office 2008–2012
- Ward: Heide

Councillor of the City of Melbourne
- In office 2012–2016

Personal details
- Born: 23 July 1969 (age 57) Brisbane, Queensland, Australia
- Party: Independent
- Other political affiliations: Liberal (1990s); People Power (2006)
- Occupation: Journalist; Shareholder activist
- Known for: Founder of Crikey

Stephen Mayne (born 23 July 1969) is an Australian journalist, local government councillor, and self-described shareholder activist. He won the Walkley Award.

== Career ==
=== Journalism ===
Mayne worked for a number of media outlets and was a media adviser to the Premier of Victoria Jeff Kennett between 1992 and 1994. In 1997 Mayne appeared on ABC TV's Four Corners as a whistleblower about Kennett's share dealings. In 1999 Mayne started the website jeffed.com devoted to complaints about Kennett in support of Mayne's abortive candidacy in the 1999 election.

He is best known for founding Crikey in 2000, an online independent news service. The combination of gossip and anti-establishment reporting got Mayne into legal (and consequent financial) trouble several times. Despite considerable financial pressures, Mayne persisted and Crikey gradually attracted subscribers and a fair degree of notoriety. It was announced on 1 February 2005 that Crikey had been sold for A$1 million to another independent media operator, Private Media Partners.

Mayne continues to write for Crikey and was a regular business commentator on ABC Radio. Mayne also regularly runs for elections to the board of directors of various Australian public companies to draw attention to issues concerning good corporate governance. He is also a trenchant critic of what he perceives as excessive conflicts of interest in corporate and political Australia.

In October 2007, Mayne launched The Mayne Report – a website that is focused on shareholder activism and corporate governance issues.

=== Politics ===
In 1999, Mayne resigned from his job at The Australian Financial Review in order to run against then Premier of Victoria Jeff Kennett as an independent protest candidate. After moving to Melbourne and making preparations for the campaign, he discovered he was unable to run because he was not enrolled, and not even entitled to be enrolled. Years later he tearfully told the ABC's Talking Heads that his father disowned him at this point, telling him not to return until he had got a job. Mayne later ran as an independent in a subsequent Burwood by-election, caused by Kennett's resignation from politics after his 1999 state election loss. Mayne attracted a primary vote of 1,975 votes (6.63%), and Labor's Bob Stensholt won the seat.

He later came to be central to the formation of the People Power party and became its largest financial supporter. The Age reported that he "would play a key role in recruiting, organising and funding the People Power campaign." In 2001, he ran as a candidate for the Lord Mayor of Melbourne, losing to John So; and in 2006 he ran as the lead Southern Metropolitan Upper House candidate for the People Power party. However, after a poor election showing, People Power folded amid much acrimony and Mayne resolved only to operate independently in future elections.

At the 2007 federal election, Mayne ran as an independent for the seat of Higgins against incumbent deputy Liberal leader and treasurer Peter Costello. He received a primary vote of 1.98 percent (1,615 votes).

On 30 November 2008, Mayne was elected to the Heide Ward in the Manningham City Council in Melbourne. In October 2012 he was elected to Melbourne City Council where he served as chair of the Finance and Governance Committee and deputy chair of the Transport committee. He spent 3 years as deputy chair of the Planning Committee until late 2015.

Mayne ran as an Independent for the Northern Metropolitan Region in the 2010 Victorian state election, winning a primary vote of almost 1 per cent. Media reports at the time had him in with a chance to win the balance of power but he failed to pull ahead of either Family First or the Green surplus and the final spot went to Liberal Craig Ondarchie.

Mayne came fourth of sixteen candidates with 4.7 per cent of the vote as an independent at the 2012 Melbourne state by-election. He recommended preferences to the Greens, however Labor retained the seat with a 51.5 per cent two-candidate preferred vote.

=== Shareholder activism ===
Mayne calls himself "Australia's most unsuccessful candidate", largely because of 48 unsuccessful tilts at public company boards since 2000. Between 2011 and 2014, Mayne worked for the Australian Shareholders Association, first as a volunteer director and later as a paid consultant performing the role of spokesman and Policy and Engagement Coordinator. During this time he collectively advocated for improved corporate governance amongst publicly–listed companies. Mayne has asked questions at more than 400 AGMs since 1998 and left the ASA to return to individual shareholder activism in September 2014.

== Walkley Awards incident ==
Australian journalism's most prestigious night descended into a shambles when Glenn Milne pushed Mayne off the stage at the 2006 Walkley Awards. As Mayne prepared to present an award to Morgan Mellish of The Australian Financial Review, a "red-faced" and "seemingly intoxicated" Milne lurched onto the stage and began a diatribe of verbal abuse. On national television, Milne then lunged at Mayne, pushing him off the stage, and screaming at Mayne that he was "a disgrace". Milne tried to run at Mayne a second time before being restrained by security guards, who frogmarched the disheveled Milne out the door. Mayne then gathered himself at the microphone, quipping, "That is the former Sunday Telegraph political correspondent Glenn Milne, sponsored by Fosters." Recalling the incident, where he suffered a sore ankle from the altercation, Mayne stated:

"I could see from his sort of wild eyes, and his red face, that he was clearly very drunk, and I thought, you know, heck, this is going to be out of control,...... And next thing I know, I'd been shoved off the stage and I was hurtling through the air, in a four-foot drop onto the floor."

— Stephen Mayne, after the 2006 Walkley Awards

The following day, Milne apologised for the outburst, saying he was affected by a mixture of alcohol and migraine pills.

== Personal life ==
Mayne is married to lawyer Paula Piccinini, who helped him run Crikey for 5 years, and they have two daughters and a son. One of his daughters, Laura, currently serves alongside him on the Manningham City Council as councillor for Schramm Ward. His sister-in-law, Patricia Piccinini, is an artist. His grandfather was the World War I veteran and British centenarian Philip Mayne.
