= People Power (Australia) =

- Leader: Vern Hughes & Stephen Mayne
- Founded: 2004; 22 years ago
- Headquarters: Melbourne, Victoria
- Ideology: Progressivism

People Power was a populist political movement in Australia that was federally registered as a political party in March 2006. The party contested its first election at the 2006 Victorian state election and was de-registered federally in December 2006.

== Policies for the Victorian election ==
- A Pokies-Free Victoria Policy

People Power released their anti-gambling policy on 4 September 2006 which aims to attack the social problems associated with compulsive gambling. The policy aims for an end to the commercial use of Poker Machines in Victoria by 2012. Under the policy, the Commonwealth Government would provide incentives for State Governments to ban the installation of poker machines.

- Stopping the Drift to Private Schools Policy

People Power released their Public Schools policy on 13 September 2006 which aims to target what it calls "one-size-fits-all schooling" in Victoria. The plan includes the abolition of Public School fees and independent reporting and monitoring of school performance.

== History ==
The party was first established in 2000 by Vern Hughes and Crikey founder Stephen Mayne, only to be suspended at the end of 2001. It was then re-established in 2004 and registered in 2006.

=== Werriwa by-election ===
A member of People Power, Deborah Locke, was one of the candidates for the 2005 Werriwa by-election that was caused by the sudden resignation of Mark Latham from parliament. However, People Power did not have official party status at the time and she was required to stand as an independent candidate. She received 3.1% of the vote, placing her 9th out of 16 candidates.

=== Victorian state election 2006 ===
People Power contested the Victorian state election in November 2006. The party fielded candidates for seats in both houses of Parliament.

On 19 September, the party's election preparations were interrupted by the resignation of lead candidate Jack Reilly and reports in the media that there were irregularities in their party registration.

The party did not win a seat in either house of Parliament.

People Power dissolved in late 2006 amidst severe internal recriminations. Following an October 2006 dispute between Vern Hughes and Robyn Allcock, the party's communication director, over drug policy, Hughes issued a press release expelling Stephen Mayne from the party on 29 November. Hughes argued Mayne was power-hungry and focused on himself, while Mayne stated that Hughes was authoritarian and obsessed with control.

=== Notable candidates ===
- Former Australian Labor Party (ALP) member for Benalla Denise Allen contested the Northern Victoria Legislative Council seat.
- Crikey's Stephen Mayne, who founded the original version of the party with Vern Hughes, announced in July 2006 that he would contest the Victorian Legislative Council seat of Southern Metropolitan Region in the 2006 Victorian state election as a People Power candidate.. But later decided that his profile as an independent journalist was preventing the party from receiving the media attention that it desperately needs. A short time later, he decided to contest for People Power after all.

Notable former candidates:

- The party's lead candidate for the Victorian legislative election was former Australian Football (Soccer) representative Jack Reilly who was slated to contest the Legislative Council seat of Northern Metropolitan. He resigned from this position on 19 September 2006. There have been contrary reports regarding his decision to resign with Stephen Mayne blaming it on the political website The Other Cheek run by Andrew Landeryou. Landeryou ran a story claiming to reveal some of Reilly's alleged business activities prior to Reilly's decision to quit. While Mayne and the Party President Vern Hughes offered different explanations initially, in an interview on ABC Radio Mayne later blamed Landeryou's claims as being the "last straw" for the party leader.
