= David Hodgett =

Australian politician

The Honourable David Hodgett MP
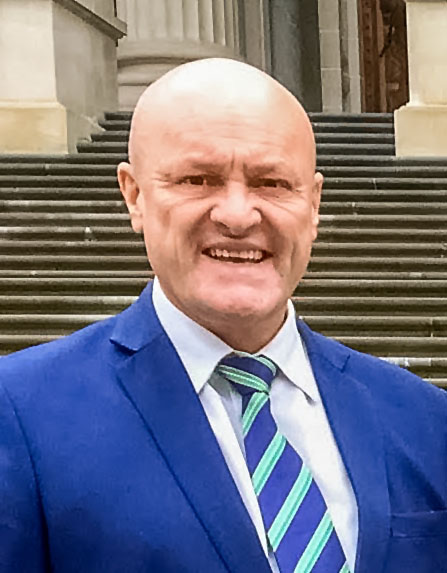
- Hodgett in 2021

Minister for Ports
- In office 13 March 2013 – 4 December 2014
- Premier: Denis Napthine
- Preceded by: Denis Napthine
- Succeeded by: Luke Donnellan

Member of the Legislative Assembly for Croydon
- Incumbent
- Assumed office 29 November 2014
- Preceded by: New seat

Member of the Legislative Assembly for Kilsyth
- In office 25 November 2006 – 29 November 2014
- Preceded by: Dympna Beard
- Succeeded by: Seat abolished

Personal details
- Born: 18 September 1963 (age 63) Cooma, New South Wales
- Party: Liberal Party
- Education: RMIT University; Swinburne University of Technology

David John Hodgett (born 18 September 1963) is an Australian politician. He has been a Liberal member of the Victorian Legislative Assembly since 2006, representing the electorates of Kilsyth (2006–2014) and Croydon (2014–present). He was the Deputy Leader of the Liberal Party from December 2014 to December 2018.

Hodgett was born in Cooma, New South Wales, and before his involvement in politics worked as a Human Relations manager for Centrelink's Area North Victorian office and as a registrar. He received a Bachelor of Business and Management in 1996 from the Royal Melbourne Institute of Technology, a Graduate Diploma in 1998 from the Australian Institute of Company Directors, a Graduate Certificate in eBusiness and Communication in 2002 from Swinburne University of Technology, and an Advanced Diploma in 2004, again from the Australian Institute of Company Directors. In 1997 he was elected to Yarra Ranges Shire Council, serving several periods as mayor (1998–99, 2004, 2004–05).

Hodgett left the council in 2005 and was preselected as the Liberal candidate for the Labor seat of Kilsyth for the 2006 state election. He successfully contested the seat of Croydon at the 2014 Victorian state election.

Hodgett is married with seven children.

Hodgett currently holds three shadow ministry portfolios. He currently holds the positions of Shadow Minister for Education, Higher Education, Training and Skills and Early Childhood and Children.

On 6 August 2025, Hodgett announced that he would not recontest his seat at the 2026 Victorian state election.

Victorian Legislative Assembly
Preceded by Dympna Beard	Member for Kilsyth; 2006–2014	Abolished
New seat	Member for Croydon; 2014–present	Incumbent
Political offices
Preceded by Denis Napthine	Minister for Ports; 2013–2014	Succeeded by Luke Donnellan
Preceded by Denis Napthine	Minister for Major Projects; 2013–2014	Ministry abolished
Preceded by Richard Dalla-Riva	Minister for Manufacturing; 2013–2014	Succeeded by Lily D'Ambrosio as Minister for Industry
Party political offices
Preceded by Louise Asher	Deputy Leader of the Liberal Party in Victoria; 2014–2018	Succeeded by Cindy McLeish
