= Electoral district of Kilsyth =

Former state electoral district of Victoria, Australia

Kilsyth Victoria—Legislative Assembly
- State: Victoria
- Created: 2002
- Abolished: 2014
- Electors: 40,627 (2010)
- Area: 41 km^{2} (15.8 sq mi)
- Demographic: Metropolitan

Kilsyth was an electoral district of the Legislative Assembly in the Australian state of Victoria. It was a 41 km² electorate located in the outer eastern suburbs of Melbourne, encompassing the suburbs of Bayswater North and Croydon South and parts of the suburbs of Kilsyth, Lilydale and Montrose. The electorate had a population of 52,701 at the 2001 census.

Kilsyth was created as a nominally Liberal seat at the 2002 election. It was contested at that election by Liberal MP Lorraine Elliott, whose nearby electorate of Mooroolbark had been abolished in the redistribution. Elliott was not expected to face a serious challenge at the election, but amidst a statewide Labor landslide, was defeated in a major upset by Labor candidate Dympna Beard. Beard's narrow victory left Kilsyth as one of the most marginal seats in the state, and she faced an extremely close race at the 2006 election. The final result was not known for several days, with Liberal candidate David Hodgett eventually being declared the victor by 185 votes. In 2010, Hodgett was returned with a significantly increased margin and over 60% of the 2PP vote.

== Members for Kilsyth ==
Member	Party	Term
Dympna Beard	Labor	2002–2006
David Hodgett	Liberal	2006–2014

== Election results ==
2010 Victorian state election: Kilsyth
Party	Candidate	Votes	%	±%
Liberal	David Hodgett	19,348	52.85	+9.23
Labor	Vicki Setches	11,172	30.52	−8.37
Greens	Justin-Paul Sammons	2,913	7.96	−0.66
Family First	Daniel Harrison	1,165	3.18	−3.56
Sex Party	Sam Haughton-Greene	1,145	3.13	+3.13
Independent	Shane McKenzie	546	1.49	+1.49
Democratic Labor	Reinhard Dekter	319	0.87	+0.87
Total formal votes		36,608	95.45	−0.63
Informal votes		1,744	4.55	+0.63
Turnout		38,352	94.40	+0.48
Two-party-preferred result
Liberal	David Hodgett	19,348	60.40	+10.13
Labor	Vicki Setches	14,503	39.60	−10.13
Liberal hold		Swing	+10.13	

== See also ==
- Parliaments of the Australian states and territories
- List of members of the Victorian Legislative Assembly
