= George Seitz (politician) =

Australian politician

- Born: 29 September 1941; Novi Slankamen, Independent State of Croatia
- Died: 5 June 2015 (aged 73)

George Seitz (29 September 1941 – 5 June 2015) was an Australian Labor Party politician who was a member of the Legislative Assembly in Victoria.

Seitz migrated to Australia with his family in 1956, and became a member of the Labor Party (ALP) in 1971. A teacher at St. Albans Technical School, in 1982, he was elected to represent the Keilor electorate. He served as Labor's whip while the party was in Opposition during the 1990s.

On 13 May 2006, The Age newspaper in Melbourne published two articles alleging that Seitz had been involved in branch stacking within his electorate, using the proceeds of community bingo games and a rental apartment to pay for memberships to the Labor Party. It was alleged that Seitz used his influence within the ALP to secure 2007 pre-selection for prominent Labor Right faction leader Bill Shorten to run for Federal Parliament. Seitz was a member of the Labor Unity faction, within the Labor Right, and in return for his efforts, a Shorten-led party administrative committee allowed Seitz to continue serving in Victorian Parliament past the usual retirement age of 65.

Seitz denied The Age's allegations

Seitz died in 2015.

Victorian Legislative Assembly
Preceded by Jack Ginifer	Member for Keilor; 1982–2010	Succeeded by Natalie Hutchins
