= Dympna Beard =

Australian politician

Dympna Anne Beard (born 27 February 1949) is a former Australian politician. She was a Labor Party member of the Victorian Legislative Assembly from 2002 to 2006.

Beard was born in Colac, Victoria. She won the seat of Kilsyth as one of a number of Labor gains at the 2002 Victorian state election. She narrowly lost the seat at the 2006 Victorian state election and stood unsuccessfully as the Labor candidate for the seat of Casey at the 2007 Australian federal election.
