= Results of the 2002 Victorian state election (Legislative Assembly) =

Australian state election results

Victorian state election, 30 November 2002 Legislative Assembly << 1999–2006 >>
Enrolled voters	3,228,466				
Votes cast	3,007,342		Turnout	93.16	–1.05
Informal votes	102,791		Informal	3.42	+0.84
Summary of votes by party
Party	Primary votes	%	Swing	Seats	Change
Labor	1,392,704	47.95	+2.38	62	+20
Liberal	985,011	33.91	–8.31	17	–19
Greens	282,585	9.73	+8.58	0	± 0
National	125,003	4.30	–0.50	7	± 0
Citizens Electoral Council	9,654	0.33	+0.33	0	± 0
Democrats	3,948	0.14	–0.14	0	± 0
Socialist Alliance	3,274	0.11	+0.04	0	± 0
Christian Democrats	1,723	0.06	+0.04	0	± 0
Democratic Labor	1,035	0.04	–0.18	0	± 0
Hope	914	0.03	–0.36	0	± 0
Independent	98,700	3.40	–1.32	2	– 1
Total	2,904,551			88	
Two-party-preferred
Labor	1,677,856	57.78	+7.58		
Liberal/National	1,226,214	42.22	–7.58		

This is a list of electoral district results for the 2002 Victorian state election.

== Results by electoral district ==
=== Albert Park ===
2002 Victorian state election: Albert Park
Party	Candidate	Votes	%	±%
Labor	John Thwaites	16,053	48.2	−8.4
Liberal	Virginia Browne	10,936	32.8	−10.6
Greens	John Middleton	5,774	17.3	+17.3
Independent	Melanie Oke	571	1.7	+1.7
Total formal votes		33,334	97.3	+0.1
Informal votes		928	2.7	−0.1
Turnout		34,262	88.5	
Two-party-preferred result
Labor	John Thwaites	20,835	62.5	+6.1
Liberal	Virginia Browne	12,499	37.5	−6.1
Labor hold		Swing	+6.1	

=== Altona ===
2002 Victorian state election: Altona
Party	Candidate	Votes	%	±%
Labor	Lynne Kosky	21,888	68.1	+2.6
Liberal	Steve Lambrinakos	7,349	22.9	−11.6
Greens	Tony Briffa	2,888	9.0	+9.0
Total formal votes		32,125	95.9	−0.4
Informal votes		1,381	4.1	+0.4
Turnout		33,506	93.7	
Two-party-preferred result
Labor	Lynne Kosky	23,995	74.7	+10.1
Liberal	Steve Lambrinakos	8,130	25.3	−10.1
Labor hold		Swing	+10.1	

=== Ballarat East ===
2002 Victorian state election: Ballarat East
Party	Candidate	Votes	%	±%
Labor	Geoff Howard	16,268	48.6	−5.1
Liberal	Gerard FitzGerald	12,010	36.0	−10.3
Greens	Scott Kinnear	4,373	13.1	+13.1
Independent	Suresh Pathy	402	1.2	+1.2
Citizens Electoral Council	Valiant Halborg	271	0.8	+0.8
Total formal votes		33,324	97.0	−0.7
Informal votes		1,037	3.0	+0.7
Turnout		34,361	94.2	
Two-party-preferred result
Labor	Geoff Howard	19,300	57.8	+4.1
Liberal	Gerard FitzGerald	14,092	42.2	−4.1
Labor hold		Swing	+4.1	

=== Ballarat West ===
2002 Victorian state election: Ballarat West
Party	Candidate	Votes	%	±%
Labor	Karen Overington	19,221	52.4	+1.4
Liberal	Judy Verlin	13,461	36.7	−12.3
Greens	Faye Backstrom	2,552	7.0	+7.0
Independent	Geoff Sullivan	912	2.5	+2.5
Christian Democrats	Rob Donker	507	1.4	+1.4
Total formal votes		36,653	97.5	−0.1
Informal votes		929	2.5	+0.1
Turnout		37,582	94.6	
Two-party-preferred result
Labor	Karen Overington	21,625	59.0	+8.0
Liberal	Judy Verlin	15,027	41.0	−8.0
Labor hold		Swing	+8.0	

=== Bass ===
2002 Victorian state election: Bass
Party	Candidate	Votes	%	±%
Liberal	Ken Smith	13,021	40.5	−4.1
Labor	John Anderson	9,012	28.0	+2.9
Independent	Susan Davies	7,014	21.8	−1.3
Greens	Nikki Ludlow	1,730	5.4	+3.3
Independent	Kay Nesbit	1,401	4.4	+4.4
Total formal votes		32,178	97.1	−0.2
Informal votes		962	2.9	+0.2
Turnout		33,140	94.0	
Two-party-preferred result
Liberal	Ken Smith	16,294	50.6	+4.2
Labor	John Anderson	15,884	49.4	+49.4
Liberal gain from Independent		Swing	+4.2	

=== Bayswater ===
2002 Victorian state election: Bayswater
Party	Candidate	Votes	%	±%
Labor	Peter Lockwood	15,215	45.7	+4.0
Liberal	Gordon Ashley	14,689	44.1	−11.0
Greens	Jill Bannan	3,380	10.2	+10.2
Total formal votes		33,284	97.4	−0.1
Informal votes		898	2.6	+0.1
Turnout		34,182	94.1	
Two-party-preferred result
Labor	Peter Lockwood	17,553	52.7	+9.0
Liberal	Gordon Ashley	15,731	47.3	−9.0
Labor gain from Liberal		Swing	+9.0	

=== Bellarine ===
2002 Victorian state election: Bellarine
Party	Candidate	Votes	%	±%
Labor	Lisa Neville	17,861	49.8	+4.8
Liberal	Frank Kelloway	14,234	39.7	−9.4
Greens	Catherine Jones	3,804	10.6	+10.6
Total formal votes		35,899	97.7	−0.4
Informal votes		836	2.3	+0.4
Turnout		36,735	95.2	
Two-party-preferred result
Labor	Lisa Neville	20,911	58.2	+9.3
Liberal	Frank Kelloway	14,988	41.8	−9.3
Labor gain from Liberal		Swing	+9.3	

=== Benalla ===
2002 Victorian state election: Benalla
Party	Candidate	Votes	%	±%
Labor	Denise Allen	13,129	41.3	−1.8
National	Bill Sykes	8,414	26.5	−26.3
Liberal	Andrew Dwyer	8,306	26.1	+22.3
Greens	Peter Stewart	1,961	6.2	+6.2
Total formal votes		31,810	97.6	+1.0
Informal votes		791	2.4	−1.0
Turnout		32,601	94.0	
Two-party-preferred result
National	Bill Sykes	16,531	52.0	−4.7
Labor	Denise Allen	15,279	48.0	+4.7
National gain from Labor		Swing	−4.7	

=== Benambra ===
2002 Victorian state election: Benambra
Party	Candidate	Votes	%	±%
Liberal	Tony Plowman	12,179	40.1	−17.4
Labor	Barb Murdoch	11,558	38.1	−4.4
National	Geoff Reid	3,818	12.6	+12.6
Greens	Helen Lucas	2,111	7.0	+7.0
Christian Democrats	Hannah Seymour	684	2.3	+2.3
Total formal votes		30,350	96.4	−0.6
Informal votes		1,119	3.6	+0.6
Turnout		31,469	92.2	+0.3
Two-party-preferred result
Liberal	Tony Plowman	16,397	54.0	−3.5
Labor	Barb Murdoch	13,953	46.0	+3.5
Liberal hold		Swing	−3.5	

=== Bendigo East ===
2002 Victorian state election: Bendigo East
Party	Candidate	Votes	%	±%
Labor	Jacinta Allan	18,639	56.4	+8.0
Liberal	Lisa Ruffell	9,223	27.9	−16.2
National	Tracee Spiby	2,966	9.0	+9.0
Greens	David Petersen	2,201	6.7	+1.8
Total formal votes		33,029	98.1	−0.1
Informal votes		631	1.9	+0.1
Turnout		33,660	94.8	−0.7
Two-party-preferred result
Labor	Jacinta Allan	20,795	63.0	+10.1
Liberal	Lisa Ruffell	12,232	37.0	−10.1
Labor hold		Swing	+10.1	

=== Bendigo West ===
2002 Victorian state election: Bendigo West
Party	Candidate	Votes	%	±%
Labor	Bob Cameron	19,865	56.4	+0.0
Liberal	Geoff Austerberry	8,112	23.0	−12.9
National	Robin Taylor	3,642	10.3	+10.3
Greens	Doug Ralph	3,583	10.2	+5.9
Total formal votes		35,202	97.5	−0.5
Informal votes		888	2.5	+0.5
Turnout		36,090	93.9	
Two-party-preferred result
Labor	Bob Cameron	23,203	65.9	+4.7
Liberal	Geoff Austerberry	11,986	34.1	−4.7
Labor hold		Swing	+4.7	

=== Bentleigh ===
2002 Victorian state election: Bentleigh
Party	Candidate	Votes	%	±%
Labor	Rob Hudson	15,983	47.6	+3.4
Liberal	Inga Peulich	14,105	42.0	−8.0
Greens	Penny Mitchell	3,195	9.5	+6.1
Citizens Electoral Council	Simon Hall	271	0.8	+0.8
Total formal votes		33,554	97.0	−0.2
Informal votes		1,039	3.0	+0.2
Turnout		34,593	94.0	+0.3
Two-party-preferred result
Labor	Rob Hudson	18,368	54.7	+6.6
Liberal	Inga Peulich	15,186	45.3	−6.6
Labor gain from Liberal		Swing	+6.6	

=== Box Hill ===
2002 Victorian state election: Box Hill
Party	Candidate	Votes	%	±%
Liberal	Robert Clark	15,935	46.8	−9.3
Labor	Robert Chong	12,777	37.5	−2.0
Greens	Helen Harris	5,347	15.7	+15.7
Total formal votes		34,059	97.3	−0.6
Informal votes		943	2.7	+0.6
Turnout		35,002	93.4	
Two-party-preferred result
Liberal	Robert Clark	17,424	51.2	−6.4
Labor	Robert Chong	16,614	48.8	+6.4
Liberal hold		Swing	−6.4	

=== Brighton ===
2002 Victorian state election: Brighton
Party	Candidate	Votes	%	±%
Liberal	Louise Asher	17,094	53.2	−4.2
Labor	Rachelle Sapir	9,926	30.9	+6.3
Greens	Clive Davies	5,116	15.9	+15.9
Total formal votes		32,136	97.7	−0.2
Informal votes		765	2.3	+0.2
Turnout		32,901	90.1	
Two-party-preferred result
Liberal	Louise Asher	18,447	57.4	−7.2
Labor	Rachelle Sapir	13,686	42.6	+7.2
Liberal hold		Swing	−7.2	

=== Broadmeadows ===
2002 Victorian state election: Broadmeadows
Party	Candidate	Votes	%	±%
Labor	John Brumby	24,060	75.5	+3.5
Liberal	Bentleigh Gibson	5,035	15.8	−6.0
Greens	Karin Geradts	1,433	4.5	+4.5
Citizens Electoral Council	Sleirman Yohanna	888	2.8	+2.8
Independent	Joseph Kaliniy	453	1.4	+0.6
Total formal votes		31,869	94.4	−0.1
Informal votes		1,891	5.6	+0.1
Turnout		33,760	90.2	
Two-party-preferred result
Labor	John Brumby	25,736	80.8	+5.9
Liberal	Bentleigh Gibson	5,035	15.8	−5.9
Labor hold		Swing	+5.9	

=== Brunswick ===
2002 Victorian state election: Brunswick
Party	Candidate	Votes	%	±%
Labor	Carlo Carli	17,075	52.1	−11.6
Greens	Pamela Curr	7,972	24.3	+18.4
Liberal	Rebecca Gauci	5,375	16.4	−10.5
Independent	Tony Morton	857	2.6	+2.6
Independent	Ken Taylor	752	2.3	+2.3
Socialist Alliance	Judy McVey	573	1.7	+1.7
Citizens Electoral Council	Steven Bird	154	0.5	+0.5
Total formal votes		32,758	94.5	−1.4
Informal votes		1,906	5.5	+1.4
Turnout		34,664	91.3	
Notional two-party-preferred count
Labor	Carlo Carli	25,554	78.0	+6.8
Liberal	Rebecca Gauci	7,192	22.0	−6.8
Two-candidate-preferred result
Labor	Carlo Carli	19,340	59.3	−11.9
Greens	Pamela Curr	13,281	40.7	+40.7
Labor hold		Swing	−11.9	

=== Bulleen ===
2002 Victorian state election: Bulleen
Party	Candidate	Votes	%	±%
Liberal	Nicholas Kotsiras	15,612	49.6	−10.2
Labor	Chris Miras	12,517	39.8	+8.2
Greens	Matthew Wright	3,330	10.6	+4.8
Total formal votes		31,459	96.6	−0.4
Informal votes		1,115	3.4	+0.4
Turnout		32,574	93.5	
Two-party-preferred result
Liberal	Nicholas Kotsiras	16,561	52.6	−10.0
Labor	Chris Miras	14,898	47.4	+10.0
Liberal hold		Swing	−10.0	

=== Bundoora ===
2002 Victorian state election: Bundoora
Party	Candidate	Votes	%	±%
Labor	Sherryl Garbutt	18,856	59.5	+3.9
Liberal	Melanie Randall	9,381	29.6	−12.4
Greens	Gayle McDonald	3,053	9.6	+9.6
Citizens Electoral Council	Walter Mellado	398	1.3	+1.3
Total formal votes		31,688	96.2	−0.8
Informal votes		1,239	3.8	+0.8
Turnout		32,927	94.0	
Two-party-preferred result
Labor	Sherryl Garbutt	21,411	67.6	+10.4
Liberal	Melanie Randall	10,277	32.4	−10.4
Labor hold		Swing	+10.4	

=== Burwood ===
2002 Victorian state election: Burwood
Party	Candidate	Votes	%	±%
Labor	Bob Stensholt	15,598	45.1	+2.3
Liberal	Di Rule	13,850	40.0	−14.6
Greens	Josephine Lee	3,989	11.5	+11.5
Independent	Tom Morissey	1,148	3.3	+3.3
Total formal votes		34,845	97.5	+0.0
Informal votes		891	2.5	−0.0
Two-party-preferred result
Labor	Bob Stensholt	19,052	55.1	+10.9
Liberal	Di Rule	15,533	44.9	−10.9
Labor hold		Swing	+10.9	

=== Carrum ===
2002 Victorian state election: Carrum
Party	Candidate	Votes	%	±%
Labor	Jenny Lindell	18,654	53.0	+5.5
Liberal	Ross MacInnes	12,325	35.0	−11.6
Greens	Darren Bujeya	3,700	10.5	+4.9
Independent	Michael Good	525	1.5	+1.5
Total formal votes		35,204	97.0	−0.2
Informal votes		1,103	3.0	+0.2
Turnout		36,307	93.4	
Two-party-preferred result
Labor	Jenny Lindell	21,873	62.2	+10.5
Liberal	Ross MacInnes	13,315	37.8	−10.5
Labor hold		Swing	+10.5	

=== Caulfield ===
2002 Victorian state election: Caulfield
Party	Candidate	Votes	%	±%
Liberal	Helen Shardey	15,608	49.1	−8.9
Labor	Harry Simon	11,138	35.0	−6.1
Greens	Ronen Becker	5,061	15.9	+15.2
Total formal votes		31,807	96.7	−0.2
Informal votes		1,082	3.3	+0.2
Turnout		32,889	90.6	
Two-party-preferred result
Liberal	Helen Shardey	16,620	52.3	−5.9
Labor	Harry Simon	15,187	47.7	+5.9
Liberal hold		Swing	−5.9	

=== Clayton ===
2002 Victorian state election: Clayton
Party	Candidate	Votes	%	±%
Labor	Hong Lim	20,223	66.4	+4.7
Liberal	Andrew Wong	7,017	23.0	−14.9
Greens	George Kirby	2,377	7.8	+7.6
Democrats	Daniel Berk	831	2.7	+2.7
Total formal votes		30,448	95.7	+0.0
Informal votes		1,374	4.3	−0.0
Turnout		31,882	91.8	
Two-party-preferred result
Labor	Hong Lim	22,479	73.8	+11.9
Liberal	Andrew Wong	7,962	26.2	−11.9
Labor hold		Swing	+11.9	

=== Cranbourne ===
2002 Victorian state election: Cranbourne
Party	Candidate	Votes	%	±%
Labor	Jude Perera	16,619	54.2	+7.9
Liberal	Gary Rowe	11,185	36.5	−10.4
Greens	Gareth Kennedy	2,402	7.8	+7.4
Citizens Electoral Council	Heather Stanton	435	1.4	+1.4
Total formal votes		30,641	96.2	−0.3
Informal votes		1,202	3.8	+0.3
Turnout		31,843	93.6	
Two-party-preferred result
Labor	Jude Perera	18,614	60.8	+9.7
Liberal	Gary Rowe	12,000	39.2	−9.7
Labor gain from Liberal		Swing	+9.7	

=== Dandenong ===
2002 Victorian state election: Dandenong
Party	Candidate	Votes	%	±%
Labor	John Pandazopoulos	20,044	65.4	+6.1
Liberal	John Kelly	8,062	26.3	−10.7
Greens	Maree Kelly	1,933	6.3	+6.3
Independent	Janet Cox	412	1.3	+1.3
Independent	Earle Keegel	209	0.7	+0.7
Total formal votes		30,660	94.3	−1.2
Informal votes		1,867	5.7	+1.2
Turnout		32,527	91.6	
Two-party-preferred result
Labor	John Pandazopoulos	21,554	70.3	+8.7
Liberal	John Kelly	9,100	29.7	−8.7
Labor hold		Swing	+8.7	

=== Derrimut ===
2002 Victorian state election: Derrimut
Party	Candidate	Votes	%	±%
Labor	Telmo Languiller	21,278	73.9	+14.8
Liberal	Adrian Lim	4,987	17.3	−9.6
Citizens Electoral Council	Andrew Kozlowski	2,514	8.7	+8.7
Total formal votes		28,779	93.0	−1.3
Informal votes		2,169	7.0	+1.3
Turnout		30,948	89.4	
Two-party-preferred result
Labor	Telmo Languiller	22,245	77.3	+7.1
Liberal	Adrian Lim	6,533	22.7	−7.1
Labor hold		Swing	+7.1	

=== Doncaster ===
2002 Victorian state election: Doncaster
Party	Candidate	Votes	%	±%
Liberal	Victor Perton	15,324	48.0	−11.8
Labor	Kate Dunn	13,652	42.7	+9.4
Greens	Kerry Dawborn	2,960	9.3	+4.4
Total formal votes		31,936	96.9	−0.3
Informal votes		1,033	3.1	+0.3
Turnout		32,969	93.1	
Two-party-preferred result
Liberal	Victor Perton	16,213	50.8	−11.5
Labor	Kate Dunn	15,723	49.2	+11.5
Liberal hold		Swing	−11.5	

=== Eltham ===
2002 Victorian state election: Eltham
Party	Candidate	Votes	%	±%
Labor	Steve Herbert	15,739	44.7	+6.0
Liberal	Wayne Phillips	14,810	42.0	−8.4
Greens	Merinda Gray	4,695	13.3	+10.3
Total formal votes		35,244	98.0	+0.4
Informal votes		728	2.0	−0.4
Turnout		35,972	95.0	
Two-party-preferred result
Labor	Steve Herbert	19,309	54.8	+8.5
Liberal	Wayne Phillips	15,935	45.2	−8.5
Labor gain from Liberal		Swing	+8.5	

=== Essendon ===
2002 Victorian state election: Essendon
Party	Candidate	Votes	%	±%
Labor	Judy Maddigan	18,255	54.5	−3.6
Liberal	Steve Reynolds	10,531	31.5	−10.4
Greens	Victor Lewis-Hansom	4,167	12.4	+12.4
Citizens Electoral Council	Colin Horne	519	1.6	+1.6
Total formal votes		33,472	96.9	−0.6
Informal votes		1,081	3.1	+0.6
Turnout		34,553	92.5	
Two-party-preferred result
Labor	Judy Maddigan	22,065	65.9	+7.8
Liberal	Steve Reynolds	11,405	34.1	−7.8
Labor hold		Swing	+7.8	

=== Evelyn ===
2002 Victorian state election: Evelyn
Party	Candidate	Votes	%	±%
Liberal	Christine Fyffe	15,386	46.1	−13.0
Labor	Heather McTaggart	14,048	42.1	+8.7
Greens	Rob Hay	2,803	8.4	+8.4
Independent	Gabriela Byrne	1,129	3.4	+3.4
Total formal votes		33,366	96.6	−0.5
Informal votes		1,192	3.4	+0.5
Turnout		34,558	93.5	
Two-party-preferred result
Labor	Heather McTaggart	16,793	50.3	+12.6
Liberal	Christine Fyffe	16,573	49.7	−12.6
Labor gain from Liberal		Swing	+12.6	

=== Ferntree Gully ===
2002 Victorian state election: Ferntree Gully
Party	Candidate	Votes	%	±%
Labor	Anne Eckstein	16,700	47.1	+7.2
Liberal	Hurtle Lupton	16,036	45.2	−11.2
Greens	Stephen Bullock	2,740	7.7	+7.7
Total formal votes		35,476	97.1	−0.4
Informal votes		1,052	2.9	+0.4
Turnout		36,528	94.6	
Two-party-preferred result
Labor	Anne Eckstein	18,548	52.3	+9.9
Liberal	Hurtle Lupton	16,928	47.7	−9.9
Labor gain from Liberal		Swing	+9.9	

=== Footscray ===
2002 Victorian state election: Footscray
Party	Candidate	Votes	%	±%
Labor	Bruce Mildenhall	18,589	59.3	−7.5
Liberal	Conrad D'Souza	4,691	15.0	−17.0
Independent	Catherine Cumming	3,255	10.4	+10.4
Greens	Janet Rice	3,181	10.1	+10.1
Socialist Alliance	Justine Kamprad	848	2.7	+2.7
Independent	Martin Nguyen	778	2.5	+2.5
Total formal votes		31,342	93.3	−1.8
Informal votes		2,234	6.7	+1.8
Turnout		33,576	89.7	
Two-party-preferred result
Labor	Bruce Mildenhall	23,444	74.8	+7.0
Liberal	Conrad D'Souza	7,878	25.2	−7.0
Labor hold		Swing	+7.0	

=== Forest Hill ===
2002 Victorian state election: Forest Hill
Party	Candidate	Votes	%	±%
Labor	Kirstie Marshall	16,105	47.1	+4.9
Liberal	Vasan Srinivasan	13,213	38.7	−16.7
Greens	Adam Pepper	3,045	8.9	+8.9
Independent	Noel Spurr	1,105	3.2	+3.2
Independent	Rodney Campbell	708	2.1	+2.1
Total formal votes		34,176	96.8	−0.6
Informal votes		1,118	3.2	+0.6
Turnout		35,294	94.1	
Two-party-preferred result
Labor	Kirstie Marshall	19,063	55.8	+12.0
Liberal	Vasan Srinivasan	15,113	44.2	−12.0
Labor gain from Liberal		Swing	+12.0	

=== Frankston ===
2002 Victorian state election: Frankston
Party	Candidate	Votes	%	±%
Labor	Alistair Harkness	15,833	47.9	+5.6
Liberal	Andrea McCall	13,385	40.5	−9.8
Greens	Henry Kelsall	3,472	10.5	+6.7
Citizens Electoral Council	Carolyn Chapple	385	1.2	+1.2
Total formal votes		33,075	96.9	+0.1
Informal votes		1,046	3.1	−0.1
Turnout		34,121	93.4	
Two-party-preferred result
Labor	Alistair Harkness	18,446	55.8	+9.0
Liberal	Andrea McCall	14,629	44.2	−9.0
Labor gain from Liberal		Swing	+9.0	

=== Geelong ===
2002 Victorian state election: Geelong
Party	Candidate	Votes	%	±%
Labor	Ian Trezise	17,680	50.6	+5.3
Liberal	Stretch Kontelj	13,266	38.0	−10.5
Greens	Elsie Teer	2,568	7.3	+7.3
Independent	Miles Hodge	967	2.8	+2.8
Independent	Andrea Battistella	233	0.7	+0.7
Independent	Richard Nixon	228	0.7	+0.7
Total formal votes		34,942	96.8	−0.5
Informal votes		1,145	3.2	+0.5
Turnout		36,087	93.8	
Two-party-preferred result
Labor	Ian Trezise	20,300	58.1	+8.5
Liberal	Stretch Kontelj	14,638	41.9	−8.5
Labor gain from Liberal		Swing	+8.5	

=== Gembrook ===
2002 Victorian state election: Gembrook
Party	Candidate	Votes	%	±%
Liberal	Neil Lucas	13,814	43.9	−8.7
Labor	Tammy Lobato	13,054	41.5	+5.2
Greens	Noel Ridgway	4,018	12.8	+7.6
Independent	Frank Dean	553	1.8	+0.7
Total formal votes		31,439	96.8	−0.8
Informal votes		1,044	3.2	+0.8
Turnout		32,483	93.9	
Two-party-preferred result
Labor	Tammy Lobato	16,217	51.6	+8.3
Liberal	Neil Lucas	15,222	48.4	−8.3
Labor gain from Liberal		Swing	+8.3	

=== Gippsland East ===
2002 Victorian state election: Gippsland East
Party	Candidate	Votes	%	±%
Independent	Craig Ingram	13,919	41.3	+18.9
National	Darren Chester	8,061	23.9	−13.0
Labor	Terry Grange	4,997	14.8	−13.0
Liberal	Leigh Dent	4,273	12.7	+12.7
Greens	Kevin Thiele	1,536	4.6	+4.6
Independent	Jacqueline McKeown	447	1.3	+1.3
Independent	Ben Buckley	444	1.3	−3.8
Total formal votes		33,677	96.1	−1.2
Informal votes		1,365	3.9	+1.2
Turnout		35,042	93.5	
Notional two-party-preferred count
National	Darren Chester	20,204	60.2	+7.4
Labor	Terry Grange	13,371	39.8	−7.4
Two-candidate-preferred result
Independent	Craig Ingram	20,791	61.7	+4.2
National	Darren Chester	12,886	38.3	−4.2
Independent hold		Swing	+4.2	

=== Gippsland South ===
2002 Victorian state election: Gippsland South
Party	Candidate	Votes	%	±%
National	Peter Ryan	12,891	38.7	−4.6
Labor	Gregg Cook	9,505	28.5	−0.8
Liberal	Jim Forbes	7,015	21.1	+14.4
Greens	Chris Aitken	3,905	11.7	+11.7
Total formal votes		33,316	97.0	−0.5
Informal votes		1,027	3.0	+0.5
Turnout		34,343	94.1	
Two-party-preferred result
National	Peter Ryan	20,274	60.9	+2.9
Labor	Gregg Cook	13,042	39.1	−2.9
National hold		Swing	+2.9	

=== Hastings ===
2002 Victorian state election: Hastings
Party	Candidate	Votes	%	±%
Liberal	Neale Burgess	15,695	46.1	−8.7
Labor	Rosy Buchanan	14,790	43.4	+6.3
Greens	Willem Olivier	3,178	9.3	+9.2
Citizens Electoral Council	Henry Broadbent	397	1.2	+1.2
Total formal votes		34,060	96.8	−0.7
Informal votes		1,133	3.2	+0.7
Turnout		35,193	93.5	
Two-party-preferred result
Labor	Rosy Buchanan	17,321	50.9	+8.0
Liberal	Neale Burgess	16,739	49.1	−8.0
Labor gain from Liberal		Swing	+8.0	

=== Hawthorn ===
2002 Victorian state election: Hawthorn
Party	Candidate	Votes	%	±%
Liberal	Ted Baillieu	16,407	49.7	−12.9
Labor	Avis Meddings	10,082	30.5	−1.9
Greens	Tania Giles	6,544	19.8	+19.8
Total formal votes		33,033	97.3	−0.4
Informal votes		921	2.7	+0.4
Turnout		33,954	91.9	
Two-party-preferred result
Liberal	Ted Baillieu	18,458	55.9	−8.2
Labor	Avis Meddings	14,575	44.1	+8.2
Liberal hold		Swing	−8.2	

=== Ivanhoe ===
2002 Victorian state election: Ivanhoe
Party	Candidate	Votes	%	±%
Labor	Craig Langdon	17,490	52.1	+2.2
Liberal	Peter Nolan	11,498	34.3	−9.0
Greens	Glen Doreian	4,067	12.1	+7.0
Independent	Anna Morton	265	0.8	+0.8
Independent	Martin Appleby	187	0.6	+0.6
Independent	Gary Schorel-Hlavka	57	0.2	+0.2
Total formal votes		33,564	96.6	−0.7
Informal votes		1,192	3.4	+0.7
Turnout		34,756	93.2	
Two-party-preferred result
Labor	Craig Langdon	20,972	62.5	+7.7
Liberal	Peter Nolan	12,586	37.5	−7.7
Labor hold		Swing	+7.7	

=== Keilor ===
2002 Victorian state election: Keilor
Party	Candidate	Votes	%	±%
Labor	George Seitz	21,952	63.4	+8.8
Liberal	Darren Buller	10,061	29.0	−11.2
Greens	Steve Nosal	2,628	7.6	+7.6
Total formal votes		34,641	95.5	−0.4
Informal votes		1,620	4.5	+0.4
Turnout		36,261	95.5	
Two-party-preferred result
Labor	George Seitz	23,566	68.0	+11.2
Liberal	Darren Buller	11,071	32.0	−11.2
Labor hold		Swing	+11.2	

=== Kew ===
2002 Victorian state election: Kew
Party	Candidate	Votes	%	±%
Liberal	Andrew McIntosh	15,807	49.5	−12.2
Labor	Maree Williams	9,926	31.1	−2.8
Greens	Cheryl Clark	5,543	17.4	+17.4
Democrats	Mary Dettman	638	2.0	+2.0
Total formal votes		31,914	97.2	−0.4
Informal votes		930	2.8	+0.4
Turnout		32,844	92.6	
Two-party-preferred result
Liberal	Andrew McIntosh	17,865	56.0	−7.8
Labor	Maree Williams	14,049	44.0	+7.8
Liberal hold		Swing	−7.8	

=== Kilsyth ===
2002 Victorian state election: Kilsyth
Party	Candidate	Votes	%	±%
Liberal	Lorraine Elliott	15,320	45.0	−12.0
Labor	Dympna Beard	15,256	44.8	+4.0
Greens	Lorraine Leach	3,455	10.2	+9.9
Total formal votes		34,031	97.1	−0.3
Informal votes		1,009	2.9	+0.3
Turnout		35,040	92.7	
Two-party-preferred result
Labor	Dympna Beard	17,726	52.1	+10.0
Liberal	Lorraine Elliott	16,305	47.9	−10.0
Labor gain from Liberal		Swing	+10.0	

=== Kororoit ===
2002 Victorian state election: Kororoit
Party	Candidate	Votes	%	±%
Labor	Andre Haermeyer	20,894	68.8	+0.8
Liberal	Joe Fenech	5,439	17.9	−8.6
Independent	Amanda George	2,384	7.8	+7.8
Independent	Bernard Reilly	1,673	5.5	+5.5
Total formal votes		30,390	94.0	−0.3
Informal votes		1,924	6.0	+0.3
Turnout		32,314	91.7	
Two-party-preferred result
Labor	Andre Haermeyer	23,415	77.1	+6.3
Liberal	Joe Fenech	6,973	22.9	−6.3
Labor hold		Swing	+6.3	

=== Lara ===
2002 Victorian state election: Lara
Party	Candidate	Votes	%	±%
Labor	Peter Loney	22,673	65.0	+2.7
Liberal	Linda Ristevski	8,921	25.6	−11.4
Greens	Kim Baranowski	2,341	6.7	+6.2
Socialist Alliance	Brigitte Ellery	965	2.8	+2.8
Total formal votes		34,900	96.2	−0.7
Informal votes		1,395	3.8	+0.7
Turnout		36,295	93.7	
Two-party-preferred result
Labor	Peter Loney	25,211	72.3	+9.6
Liberal	Linda Ristevski	9,638	27.7	−9.6
Labor hold		Swing	+9.6	

=== Lowan ===
2002 Victorian state election: Lowan
Party	Candidate	Votes	%	±%
National	Hugh Delahunty	14,568	40.7	+21.9
Liberal	Howard Templeton	9,871	27.6	−9.3
Labor	Charles Williams	9,683	27.1	+4.3
Greens	David Brain	1,658	4.6	+4.6
Total formal votes		35,780	97.5	−0.3
Informal votes		917	2.5	+0.3
Turnout		36,697	95.6	
Two-party-preferred result
National	Hugh Delahunty	24,001	67.1	+5.2
Labor	Charles Williams	11,779	32.9	−5.2
National hold		Swing	+5.2	

=== Lyndhurst ===
2002 Victorian state election: Lyndhurst
Party	Candidate	Votes	%	±%
Labor	Tim Holding	20,862	68.3	+10.1
Liberal	Alan Hood	6,906	22.6	−13.7
Greens	Theos Patrinos	2,293	7.5	+7.5
Independent	Gordon Ford	503	1.6	+1.6
Total formal votes		30,564	95.2	−0.3
Informal votes		1,551	4.8	+0.3
Turnout		32,115	92.4	
Two-party-preferred result
Labor	Tim Holding	22,927	75.1	+14.5
Liberal	Alan Hood	7,610	24.9	−14.5
Labor hold		Swing	+14.5	

=== Macedon ===
2002 Victorian state election: Macedon
Party	Candidate	Votes	%	±%
Labor	Joanne Duncan	19,119	52.6	+11.5
Liberal	Bernie Finn	12,944	35.6	−8.9
Greens	Marcus Ward	3,830	10.5	+7.8
Citizens Electoral Council	Bradley Scott	426	1.2	+1.2
Total formal votes		36,319	97.6	+0.0
Informal votes		904	2.4	−0.0
Turnout		37,223	95.1	
Two-party-preferred result
Labor	Joanne Duncan	21,513	59.2	+9.6
Liberal	Bernie Finn	14,798	40.8	−9.6
Labor gain from Liberal		Swing	+9.6	

=== Malvern ===
2002 Victorian state election: Malvern
Party	Candidate	Votes	%	±%
Liberal	Robert Doyle	18,036	55.1	−10.8
Labor	Rolf Sorensen	9,758	29.8	−4.0
Greens	Robert Trafficante	4,389	13.4	+13.3
Independent	Norman Pollack	524	1.6	+1.6
Total formal votes		32,707	97.4	−0.4
Informal votes		874	2.6	+0.4
Turnout		33,581	91.6	
Two-party-preferred result
Liberal	Robert Doyle	19,669	60.2	−5.9
Labor	Rolf Sorensen	13,014	39.8	+5.9
Liberal hold		Swing	−5.9	

=== Melbourne ===
2002 Victorian state election: Melbourne
Party	Candidate	Votes	%	±%
Labor	Bronwyn Pike	12,882	45.3	−12.7
Greens	Richard Di Natale	6,880	24.2	+24.2
Liberal	Sue Bourke	5,971	21.0	−15.3
Independent Labor	Kevin Chamberlin	1,690	5.9	+5.9
Socialist Alliance	Arun Pradhan	290	1.0	+1.0
Independent	Maxine Fensom	253	0.9	+0.9
Citizens Electoral Council	Jeremy Beck	242	0.9	+0.9
Independent	Michael Cebon	214	0.8	+0.8
Total formal votes		28,422	95.9	−0.4
Informal votes		1,212	4.1	+0.4
Turnout		29,634	87.5	
Notional two-party-preferred count
Labor	Bronwyn Pike	20,510	72.2	+9.8
Liberal	Sue Bourke	7,910	27.8	−9.8
Two-candidate-preferred result
Labor	Bronwyn Pike	14,757	51.9	−10.4
Greens	Richard Di Natale	13,665	48.1	+48.1
Labor hold		Swing	N/A	

=== Melton ===
2002 Victorian state election: Melton
Party	Candidate	Votes	%	±%
Labor	Don Nardella	17,535	55.1	+0.7
Liberal	Richard Gough	7,919	24.9	−17.2
Greens	Ken Stewart	2,355	7.4	+6.9
Independent	John Hyett	2,199	6.9	+6.9
Independent	John Goodman	1,028	3.2	+3.2
Independent	Terry Muscat	669	2.1	+2.1
Independent	Frank McColl	111	0.3	+0.3
Total formal votes		31,816	95.5	−0.5
Informal votes		1,495	4.5	+0.5
Turnout		33,311	93.9	
Two-party-preferred result
Labor	Don Nardella	20,764	65.3	+8.7
Liberal	Richard Gough	11,022	34.7	−8.7
Labor hold		Swing	+8.7	

=== Mildura ===
2002 Victorian state election: Mildura
Party	Candidate	Votes	%	±%
Independent	Russell Savage	16,712	51.7	+8.8
National	Tom Crouch	8,136	25.2	+3.8
Liberal	Stan Sleep	3,316	10.3	−14.4
Labor	John Zigouras	3,075	9.5	+0.4
Greens	Bruce Rivendell	563	1.7	+1.7
Independent	Tony Cursaro	535	1.7	+1.7
Total formal votes		32,337	96.9	−0.4
Informal votes		1,043	3.1	+0.4
Turnout		33,380	92.5	
Notional two-party-preferred count
National	Tom Crouch	18,284	56.7	−6.6
Labor	John Zigouras	13,957	43.3	+6.6
Two-candidate-preferred result
Independent	Russell Savage	22,121	68.4	+12.5
National	Tom Crouch	10,197	31.6	+31.6
Independent hold		Swing	+12.5	

=== Mill Park ===
2002 Victorian state election: Mill Park
Party	Candidate	Votes	%	±%
Labor	Lily D'Ambrosio	22,746	70.1	+7.5
Liberal	Lucas Kostadinoski	6,815	21.0	−13.9
Greens	Berhan Ahmed	2,014	6.2	+6.2
Democrats	Brian Mawhinney	878	2.7	+2.7
Total formal votes		32,453	95.6	−0.7
Informal votes		1,484	4.4	+0.7
Turnout		33,937	94.5	
Two-party-preferred result
Labor	Lily D'Ambrosio	24,915	76.8	+13.0
Liberal	Lucas Kostadinoski	7,536	23.2	−13.0
Labor hold		Swing	+13.0	

=== Mitcham ===
2002 Victorian state election: Mitcham
Party	Candidate	Votes	%	±%
Labor	Tony Robinson	16,097	47.8	+3.0
Liberal	Russell Hannan	12,735	37.9	−9.9
Greens	Bill Pemberton	3,559	10.6	+10.6
Independent	Kaele Way	946	2.8	+2.8
Independent	Liz Turner	307	0.9	+0.9
Total formal votes		33,644	97.4	−0.4
Informal votes		906	2.6	+0.4
Turnout		34,550	94.2	
Two-party-preferred result
Labor	Tony Robinson	19,405	57.7	+7.7
Liberal	Russell Hannan	14,239	42.3	−7.7
Labor hold		Swing	+7.7	

=== Monbulk ===
2002 Victorian state election: Monbulk
Party	Candidate	Votes	%	±%
Labor	James Merlino	14,303	43.6	+3.0
Liberal	Steve McArthur	12,285	37.4	−11.6
Greens	Craig Smith	5,182	15.8	+8.8
Democrats	Tony Holland	537	1.6	+1.6
Christian Democrats	Wolf Voigt	532	1.6	+0.4
Total formal votes		32,839	97.1	−0.2
Informal votes		974	2.9	+0.2
Turnout		33,813	93.6	
Two-party-preferred result
Labor	James Merlino	19,132	58.3	+10.7
Liberal	Steve McArthur	13,707	41.7	−10.7
Labor gain from Liberal		Swing	+10.7	

=== Mordialloc ===
2002 Victorian state election: Mordialloc
Party	Candidate	Votes	%	±%
Labor	Janice Munt	15,832	46.1	−0.9
Liberal	Geoff Leigh	14,676	42.8	−9.5
Greens	Shaun Monagle	3,463	10.1	+9.4
Citizens Electoral Council	Frank Gigliotti	356	1.0	+1.0
Total formal votes		34,327	97.1	−0.0
Informal votes		1,034	2.9	+0.0
Turnout		35,361	94.0	
Two-party-preferred result
Labor	Janice Munt	18,717	54.5	+7.0
Liberal	Geoff Leigh	15,610	45.5	−7.0
Labor gain from Liberal		Swing	+7.0	

=== Mornington ===
2002 Victorian state election: Mornington
Party	Candidate	Votes	%	±%
Liberal	Robin Cooper	15,608	49.4	−10.0
Labor	Judith Graley	12,424	39.3	+8.5
Greens	Paula Johnson	3,591	11.4	+9.2
Total formal votes		31,623	97.7	−0.3
Informal votes		730	2.3	+0.3
Turnout		32,353	93.7	
Two-party-preferred result
Liberal	Robin Cooper	16,388	51.8	−10.0
Labor	Judith Graley	15,235	48.2	+10.0
Liberal hold		Swing	−10.0	

=== Morwell ===
2002 Victorian state election: Morwell
Party	Candidate	Votes	%	±%
Labor	Brendan Jenkins	14,073	43.2	−12.4
Liberal	Diane Blackwood	6,289	19.3	−15.5
Independent	Brad Platschinda	4,733	14.5	+14.5
National	Jenny Hammett	4,014	12.3	+12.3
Greens	Catheryn Thompson	1,917	5.9	+5.9
Independent	Harry Alexander	1,521	4.7	+4.7
Total formal votes		32,547	96.3	−1.5
Informal votes		1,257	3.7	+1.5
Turnout		33,804	93.8	
Two-party-preferred result
Labor	Brendan Jenkins	17,855	54.9	−4.4
Liberal	Diane Blackwood	14,692	45.1	+4.4
Labor hold		Swing	−4.4	

=== Mount Waverley ===
2002 Victorian state election: Mount Waverley
Party	Candidate	Votes	%	±%
Liberal	Ron Wilson	14,984	44.6	−14.2
Labor	Maxine Morand	14,902	44.4	+3.6
Greens	John Poppins	2,849	8.5	+8.5
Democrats	Therese Bennett	560	1.7	+1.7
Independent	Matthew Bond	284	0.8	+0.8
Total formal votes		33,579	97.0	−0.6
Informal votes		1,036	3.0	+0.6
Turnout		34,615	94.2	
Two-party-preferred result
Labor	Maxine Morand	17,559	52.3	+11.3
Liberal	Ron Wilson	16,020	47.7	−11.3
Labor gain from Liberal		Swing	+11.3	

=== Mulgrave ===
2002 Victorian state election: Mulgrave
Party	Candidate	Votes	%	±%
Labor	Daniel Andrews	18,804	61.7	+9.8
Liberal	Chris Kelly	9,431	30.9	−12.6
Greens	Colin Smith	1,845	6.1	+6.1
Independent	Dikran Chabdjian	410	1.3	+1.3
Total formal votes		30,490	95.8	−0.4
Informal votes		1,325	4.2	+0.4
Turnout		31,815	92.7	
Two-party-preferred result
Labor	Daniel Andrews	20,188	66.2	+11.9
Liberal	Chris Kelly	10,296	33.8	−11.9
Labor hold		Swing	+11.9	

=== Murray Valley ===
2002 Victorian state election: Murray Valley
Party	Candidate	Votes	%	±%
National	Ken Jasper	13,778	43.1	−22.3
Labor	Lauren O'Neill	9,846	30.8	−3.5
Liberal	Don Joyce	6,565	20.5	+20.2
Greens	Trisha Scott	1,764	5.5	+5.5
Total formal votes		31,953	97.1	+0.1
Informal votes		964	2.9	−0.1
Turnout		32,917	93.8	
Two-party-preferred result
National	Ken Jasper	20,416	63.9	−1.8
Labor	Lauren O'Neill	11,537	36.1	+1.8
National hold		Swing	−1.8	

=== Narracan ===
2002 Victorian state election: Narracan
Party	Candidate	Votes	%	±%
Labor	Ian Maxfield	15,908	46.5	+5.9
Liberal	Karen Stoll	11,469	33.5	−9.7
National	Ian Needham	2,840	8.3	+7.1
Greens	Kate Jackson	2,033	5.9	+5.9
Independent	Tony Sayers	1,995	5.8	+5.8
Total formal votes		34,245	97.0	+0.1
Informal votes		1,044	3.0	−0.1
Turnout		35,289	94.6	
Two-party-preferred result
Labor	Ian Maxfield	19,471	56.8	+7.4
Liberal	Karen Stoll	14,794	43.2	−7.4
Labor gain from Liberal		Swing	+7.4	

=== Narre Warren North ===
2002 Victorian state election: Narre Warren North
Party	Candidate	Votes	%	±%
Labor	Luke Donnellan	17,537	55.1	+12.8
Liberal	Maree Luckins	11,874	37.3	−16.8
Greens	Glen Haywood	2,406	7.6	+7.6
Total formal votes		31,817	96.6	−0.4
Informal votes		1,134	3.4	+0.4
Turnout		32,951	94.0	
Two-party-preferred result
Labor	Luke Donnellan	18,991	59.7	+14.8
Liberal	Maree Luckins	12,822	40.3	−14.8
Labor gain from Liberal		Swing	+14.8	

=== Narre Warren South ===
2002 Victorian state election: Narre Warren South
Party	Candidate	Votes	%	±%
Labor	Dale Wilson	19,868	58.3	+10.2
Liberal	Michael Shepherdson	12,145	35.6	−15.4
Greens	Thom Lyons	2,066	6.1	+6.1
Total formal votes		34,079	96.5	−0.4
Informal votes		1,240	3.5	+0.4
Turnout		35,319	94.0	
Two-party-preferred result
Labor	Dale Wilson	21,318	62.6	+13.9
Liberal	Michael Shepherdson	12,758	37.4	−13.9
Labor gain from Liberal		Swing	+13.9	

=== Nepean ===
2002 Victorian state election: Nepean
Party	Candidate	Votes	%	±%
Liberal	Martin Dixon	15,543	47.2	−7.2
Labor	Carole Ford	13,636	41.4	+0.2
Greens	David De Rango	3,733	11.3	+11.3
Total formal votes		32,912	97.0	−0.6
Informal votes		1,010	3.0	+0.6
Turnout		33,922	93.8	
Two-party-preferred result
Liberal	Martin Dixon	16,513	50.2	−6.0
Labor	Carole Ford	16,399	49.8	+6.0
Liberal hold		Swing	−6.0	

=== Niddrie ===
2002 Victorian state election: Niddrie
Party	Candidate	Votes	%	±%
Labor	Rob Hulls	19,952	60.1	+3.9
Liberal	Susan Jennison	9,810	29.5	−13.6
Greens	Matthew Klugman	2,414	7.3	+7.3
Democratic Labor	Pat Crea	1,035	3.1	+3.1
Total formal votes		33,211	95.6	−0.5
Informal votes		1,527	4.4	+0.5
Turnout		34,738	94.2	
Two-party-preferred result
Labor	Rob Hulls	22,114	66.6	+10.2
Liberal	Susan Jennison	11,088	33.4	−10.2
Labor hold		Swing	+10.2	

=== Northcote ===
2002 Victorian state election: Northcote
Party	Candidate	Votes	%	±%
Labor	Mary Delahunty	18,229	55.2	−11.2
Greens	Sarah Nicholson	8,394	25.4	+25.4
Liberal	Graham Watt	5,550	16.8	−9.2
Socialist Alliance	Jackie Lynch	598	1.8	+1.8
Citizens Electoral Council	Paul Gallagher	260	0.8	+0.8
Total formal votes		33,031	95.8	−0.1
Informal votes		1,434	4.2	+0.1
Turnout		34,465	91.4	
Notional two-party-preferred count
Labor	Mary Delahunty	25,857	78.3	+5.7
Liberal	Graham Watt	7,157	21.7	−5.7
Two-candidate-preferred result
Labor	Mary Delahunty	19,103	57.9	−14.7
Greens	Sarah Nicholson	13,892	42.1	+42.1
Labor hold		Swing	−14.7	

=== Oakleigh ===
2002 Victorian state election: Oakleigh
Party	Candidate	Votes	%	±%
Labor	Ann Barker	16,999	54.2	+5.0
Liberal	Peter Goudge	9,754	31.1	−14.0
Greens	Ollie Bennett	3,389	10.8	+7.7
Independent	Tina Skouzis	1,193	3.8	+3.8
Total formal votes		31,335	96.9	+0.4
Informal votes		1,000	3.1	−0.4
Turnout		32,335	92.4	
Two-party-preferred result
Labor	Ann Barker	20,432	65.2	+12.3
Liberal	Peter Goudge	10,902	34.8	−12.3
Labor hold		Swing	+12.3	

=== Pascoe Vale ===
2002 Victorian state election: Pascoe Vale
Party	Candidate	Votes	%	±%
Labor	Christine Campbell	21,989	67.0	+1.5
Liberal	Steve Clancy	7,400	22.5	−10.0
Greens	Peter Elgood	2,905	8.8	+7.2
Citizens Electoral Council	Craig Isherwood	538	1.6	+1.6
Total formal votes		32,832	95.2	−0.8
Informal votes		1,665	4.8	+0.8
Turnout		34,497	91.7	
Two-party-preferred result
Labor	Christine Campbell	24,359	74.2	+7.3
Liberal	Steve Clancy	8,468	25.8	−7.3
Labor hold		Swing	+7.3	

=== Polwarth ===
2002 Victorian state election: Polwarth
Party	Candidate	Votes	%	±%
Liberal	Terry Mulder	17,342	48.3	+5.0
Labor	Steve Gartland	11,141	31.0	+8.3
National	Doug Chant	3,700	10.3	−6.6
Greens	Natalie Atherden	3,163	8.8	+5.2
Independent	Andrew Mitchell	570	1.6	+1.6
Total formal votes		35,916	96.2	−1.5
Informal votes		1,416	3.8	+1.5
Turnout		37,332	95.3	
Two-party-preferred result
Liberal	Terry Mulder	21,413	59.5	−3.5
Labor	Steve Gartland	14,557	40.5	+3.5
Liberal hold		Swing	−3.5	

=== Prahran ===
2002 Victorian state election: Prahran
Party	Candidate	Votes	%	±%
Liberal	Leonie Burke	12,713	41.0	−10.7
Labor	Tony Lupton	11,772	38.0	−1.4
Greens	Dinesh Mathew	5,591	18.0	+11.4
Democrats	John Gourlay	504	1.6	+1.6
Independent	Abraham Lincoln	419	1.4	+1.4
Total formal votes		30,999	97.1	−0.2
Informal votes		921	2.9	+0.2
Turnout		31,920	86.6	
Two-party-preferred result
Labor	Tony Lupton	16,869	54.4	+9.1
Liberal	Leonie Burke	14,130	45.6	−9.1
Labor gain from Liberal		Swing	+9.1	

=== Preston ===
2002 Victorian state election: Preston
Party	Candidate	Votes	%	±%
Labor	Michael Leighton	22,271	66.7	−0.5
Liberal	Lawrence Dean	6,267	18.8	−10.6
Greens	Chris Chaplin	4,458	13.3	+13.0
Citizens Electoral Council	Noelene Isherwood	415	1.2	+1.2
Total formal votes		33,411	95.5	−0.2
Informal votes		1,575	4.5	+0.2
Turnout		34,986	91.6	
Two-party-preferred result
Labor	Michael Leighton	25,785	77.2	+8.4
Liberal	Lawrence Dean	7,617	22.8	−8.4
Labor hold		Swing	+8.4	

=== Richmond ===
2002 Victorian state election: Richmond
Party	Candidate	Votes	%	±%
Labor	Richard Wynne	15,016	47.5	−9.5
Greens	Gemma Pinnell	9,055	28.6	+28.6
Liberal	Paul Teiwes	6,251	19.8	−11.4
Independent	Paul Mees	668	2.1	+2.1
Independent	Stephen Jolly	629	2.0	−9.8
Total formal votes		31,619	96.7	+0.4
Informal votes		1,063	3.3	−0.4
Turnout		32,682	88.2	
Notional two-party-preferred count
Labor	Richard Wynne	23,933	75.5	+9.8
Liberal	Paul Teiwes	7,747	24.5	−9.8
Two-candidate-preferred result
Labor	Richard Wynne	16,787	53.1	−12.6
Greens	Gemma Pinnell	14,832	46.9	+46.9
Labor hold		Swing	−12.6	

=== Ripon ===
2002 Victorian state election: Ripon
Party	Candidate	Votes	%	±%
Labor	Joe Helper	17,439	52.4	+3.1
Liberal	Rob de Fegely	11,278	33.9	−9.5
National	Kevin Erwin	2,588	7.8	+2.8
Greens	Phil Millar	1,581	4.8	+4.6
Independent	John McCallum	367	1.1	+1.1
Total formal votes		33,253	97.2	−0.3
Informal votes		967	2.8	+0.3
Turnout		34,220	94.9	
Two-party-preferred result
Labor	Joe Helper	19,097	57.4	+5.8
Liberal	Rob de Fegely	14,155	42.6	−5.8
Labor hold		Swing	+5.8	

=== Rodney ===
2002 Victorian state election: Rodney
Party	Candidate	Votes	%	±%
National	Noel Maughan	11,040	34.3	−22.1
Liberal	Simon Frost	9,723	30.2	+26.8
Labor	Malcolm McCullough	8,212	25.5	−4.6
Independent	Greg Toll	1,812	5.6	+5.6
Greens	Peter Williams	1,414	4.4	+4.2
Total formal votes		32,201	96.8	−1.0
Informal votes		1,071	3.2	+1.0
Turnout		33,272	94.6	
Notional two-party-preferred count
National	Noel Maughan	21,380	66.4	+2.1
Labor	Malcolm McCullough	10,807	33.6	−2.1
Two-candidate-preferred result
National	Noel Maughan	19,305	60.0	−4.3
Liberal	Simon Frost	12,896	40.0	+40.0
National hold		Swing	−4.3	

=== Sandringham ===
2002 Victorian state election: Sandringham
Party	Candidate	Votes	%	±%
Liberal	Murray Thompson	16,036	49.0	−12.9
Labor	Justin Caruana	11,140	34.1	−3.6
Greens	Sam Watkins	4,265	13.0	+13.0
Independent	Nicholas Eden	1,264	3.9	+3.9
Total formal votes		32,705	97.6	+0.2
Informal votes		806	2.4	−0.2
Turnout		33,511	92.9	
Two-party-preferred result
Liberal	Murray Thompson	17,345	53.0	−9.1
Labor	Justin Caruana	15,360	47.0	+9.1
Liberal hold		Swing	−9.1	

=== Scoresby ===
2002 Victorian state election: Scoresby
Party	Candidate	Votes	%	±%
Liberal	Kim Wells	17,617	51.3	−13.5
Labor	Pollyanne Williams	14,118	41.1	+6.0
Greens	Genevieve O'Connell	2,588	7.5	+7.5
Total formal votes		34,323	97.1	−0.5
Informal votes		1,023	2.9	+0.5
Turnout		35,346	93.8	
Two-party-preferred result
Liberal	Kim Wells	18,291	53.3	−11.5
Labor	Pollyanne Williams	16,016	46.7	+11.5
Liberal hold		Swing	−11.5	

=== Seymour ===
2002 Victorian state election: Seymour
Party	Candidate	Votes	%	±%
Labor	Ben Hardman	17,143	52.5	+6.1
Liberal	Mike Dalmau	12,350	37.8	−5.2
Greens	Chelsea McNab	3,178	9.7	+4.7
Total formal votes		32,671	97.5	+0.3
Informal votes		836	2.5	−0.3
Turnout		33,507	94.2	
Two-party-preferred result
Labor	Ben Hardman	19,434	59.5	+9.4
Liberal	Mike Dalmau	13,236	40.5	−9.4
Labor hold		Swing	+9.4	

=== Shepparton ===
2002 Victorian state election: Shepparton
Party	Candidate	Votes	%	±%
Liberal	Stephen Merrylees	9,662	30.0	+30.0
National	Jeanette Powell	9,268	28.8	−11.7
Labor	Alan Calder	7,050	21.9	−2.7
Independent	Chris Hazelman	5,129	15.9	−18.9
Greens	John Griffiths	1,057	3.3	+3.3
Total formal votes		32,166	96.4	−0.9
Informal votes		1,202	3.6	+0.9
Turnout		33,368	93.3	
Notional two-party-preferred count
National	Jeanette Powell	20,933	65.1	+2.8
Labor	Alan Calder	11,209	34.9	−2.8
Two-candidate-preferred result
National	Jeanette Powell	17,458	54.3	−0.1
Liberal	Stephen Merrylees	14,708	45.7	+45.7
National hold		Swing	−0.1	

=== South Barwon ===
2002 Victorian state election: South Barwon
Party	Candidate	Votes	%	±%
Labor	Michael Crutchfield	17,132	47.4	+10.0
Liberal	Alister Paterson	14,278	39.5	−11.2
Greens	Iain Lygo	3,372	9.3	+5.6
Independent	Andrew Hepner	1,212	3.4	+3.4
Independent	Eric Bullmore	147	0.4	+0.4
Total formal votes		36,141	97.1	−0.7
Informal votes		1,078	2.9	+0.7
Turnout		37,219	94.7	
Two-party-preferred result
Labor	Michael Crutchfield	19,880	55.0	+9.7
Liberal	Alister Paterson	16,261	45.0	−9.7
Labor gain from Liberal		Swing	+9.7	

=== South-West Coast ===
2002 Victorian state election: South-West Coast
Party	Candidate	Votes	%	±%
Labor	Roy Reekie	15,161	41.3	+6.5
Liberal	Denis Napthine	14,809	40.3	+0.7
National	Gerald Madden	4,213	11.5	−0.5
Greens	Gillian Blair	2,568	7.0	+5.3
Total formal votes		36,751	96.9	−0.4
Informal votes		1,183	3.1	+0.4
Turnout		37,934	94.6	
Two-party-preferred result
Liberal	Denis Napthine	18,647	50.7	−4.2
Labor	Roy Reekie	18,104	49.3	+4.2
Liberal hold		Swing	−4.2	

=== Swan Hill ===
2002 Victorian state election: Swan Hill
Party	Candidate	Votes	%	±%
National	Peter Walsh	11,066	34.9	−5.8
Liberal	Suellen Tomamichel	8,438	26.6	+18.7
Labor	Graeme Hill	8,384	26.4	+4.4
Independent	Rob Sonogan	2,217	7.0	+7.0
Greens	Jacquie Kelly	1,635	5.2	+5.2
Total formal votes		31,740	96.8	+0.2
Informal votes		1,038	3.2	−0.2
Turnout		32,778	94.6	
Two-party-preferred result
National	Peter Walsh	20,362	64.2	+2.2
Labor	Graeme Hill	11,378	35.8	−2.2
National hold		Swing	+2.2	

=== Tarneit ===
2002 Victorian state election: Tarneit
Party	Candidate	Votes	%	±%
Labor	Mary Gillett	21,246	63.5	+5.2
Liberal	James Hanrahan	9,382	28.1	−9.8
Independent	Christine Hudson	2,811	8.4	+8.4
Total formal votes		33,439	96.3	−0.5
Informal votes		1,270	3.7	+0.5
Turnout		34,709	93.5	
Two-party-preferred result
Labor	Mary Gillett	22,538	67.4	+6.8
Liberal	James Hanrahan	10,901	32.6	−6.8
Labor hold		Swing	+6.8	

=== Thomastown ===
2002 Victorian state election: Thomastown
Party	Candidate	Votes	%	±%
Labor	Peter Batchelor	25,473	75.8	+2.0
Liberal	Adam Woolcock	5,561	16.6	−9.2
Greens	Zhivan Rendevski	2,562	7.6	+7.6
Total formal votes		33,596	94.4	−1.0
Informal votes		1,994	5.6	+1.0
Turnout		35,590	93.4	
Two-party-preferred result
Labor	Peter Batchelor	27,451	81.7	+7.6
Liberal	Adam Woolcock	6,132	18.3	−7.6
Labor hold		Swing	+7.6	

=== Warrandyte ===
2002 Victorian state election: Warrandyte
Party	Candidate	Votes	%	±%
Liberal	Phil Honeywood	18,742	52.4	−9.5
Labor	Jarrod Panther	12,529	35.0	+1.4
Greens	Barry Watson	3,570	10.0	+10.0
Hope	Tim Petherbridge	914	2.6	−1.2
Total formal votes		35,755	97.6	−0.5
Informal votes		879	2.4	+0.5
Turnout		36,634	93.8	
Two-party-preferred result
Liberal	Phil Honeywood	20,145	56.3	−7.5
Labor	Jarrod Panther	15,605	43.7	+7.5
Liberal hold		Swing	−7.5	

=== Williamstown ===
2002 Victorian state election: Williamstown
Party	Candidate	Votes	%	±%
Labor	Steve Bracks	21,600	64.6	−1.9
Liberal	Alan Evers-Buckland	6,274	18.8	−10.8
Greens	Michele Finey	3,422	10.2	+10.2
Independent	John Westbury	2,122	6.3	+6.3
Total formal votes		33,418	96.6	+0.2
Informal votes		1,178	3.4	−0.2
Turnout		34,596	92.2	
Two-party-preferred result
Labor	Steve Bracks	25,295	75.7	+7.6
Liberal	Alan Evers-Buckland	8,114	24.3	−7.6
Labor hold		Swing	+7.6	

=== Yan Yean ===
2002 Victorian state election: Yan Yean
Party	Candidate	Votes	%	±%
Labor	Danielle Green	15,980	49.5	+4.0
Liberal	Matthew Guy	12,396	38.4	−9.9
Greens	Patrick Vaughan	3,503	10.9	+9.5
Citizens Electoral Council	Simon Steer	380	1.2	+1.2
Total formal votes		32,259	97.1	−0.3
Informal votes		952	2.9	+0.3
Turnout		33,211	95.2	
Two-party-preferred result
Labor	Danielle Green	19,204	59.5	+10.2
Liberal	Matthew Guy	13,055	40.5	−10.2
Labor gain from Liberal		Swing	+10.2	

=== Yuroke ===
2002 Victorian state election: Yuroke
Party	Candidate	Votes	%	±%
Labor	Liz Beattie	23,161	71.3	+14.8
Liberal	Robert Dunstan	8,531	26.3	−11.9
Citizens Electoral Council	Tanzie Chowdhury	805	2.5	+2.5
Total formal votes		32,497	95.9	−0.4
Informal votes		1,404	4.1	+0.4
Turnout		33,901	94.3	
Two-party-preferred result
Labor	Liz Beattie	23,683	72.9	+13.9
Liberal	Robert Dunstan	8,813	27.1	−13.9
Labor hold		Swing	+13.9	

== See also ==
- 2002 Victorian state election
- Candidates of the 2002 Victorian state election
- Members of the Victorian Legislative Assembly, 2002–2006
