= Electoral results for the district of Bass =

Victoria, Australia, district election results

This is a list of electoral results for the district of Bass in Victorian state elections.

== Members for Bass ==
Image	Member	Party	Term	Notes
	Ken Smith (1944–)	Liberal	30 November 2002 – 29 November 2014	Speaker of the Legislative Assembly from 2010 until 2014. Retired
	Brian Paynter (1965–)	Liberal	29 November 2014 – 24 November 2018	Lost seat
	Jordan Crugnale (1969–)	Labor	24 November 2018 – present	Incumbent

== Election results ==
=== Elections in the 2020s ===
==== 2022 ====
2022 Victorian state election: Bass
Party	Candidate	Votes	%	±%
Labor	Jordan Crugnale	13,478	32.6	−4.1
Liberal	Aaron Brown	12,482	30.1	−13.4
National	Brett Tessari	5,506	13.3	+13.3
Greens	Callum Bugbird	3,369	8.1	+1.9
Democratic Labour	Mark O'Neill	1,465	3.5	+1.7
Family First	Martin Verhagen	1,164	2.8	+2.8
Animal Justice	Elly Mousellis	1,085	2.6	+1.4
Freedom	Marcus Munday	1,013	2.4	+2.4
Independent	Jeni Jobe	970	2.3	+2.3
Independent	Meg Edwards	872	2.1	+2.1
Total formal votes		41,404	93.0	–0.6
Informal votes		3,135	7.0	+0.6
Turnout		44,539	89.1	+4.5
Two-party-preferred result
Labor	Jordan Crugnale	20,803	50.2	+0.9
Liberal	Aaron Brown	20,601	49.8	−0.9
Labor notional gain from Liberal		Swing	+0.9	

=== Elections in the 2010s ===
==== 2018 ====
2018 Victorian state election: Bass
Party	Candidate	Votes	%	±%
Liberal	Brian Paynter	20,315	40.97	−4.38
Labor	Jordan Crugnale	19,954	40.24	+10.88
Greens	David Arnault	2,821	5.69	−3.41
Independent	Clare Le Serve	2,212	4.46	−6.34
Shooters, Fishers, Farmers	Frank Ripa	2,011	4.06	+4.06
Democratic Labour	Ross McPhee	1,288	2.60	+2.60
Independent	Ron Bauer	603	1.22	+1.22
Independent	Kate Lempriere	385	0.78	+0.78
Total formal votes		49,589	93.37	−1.22
Informal votes		3,522	6.63	+1.22
Turnout		53,111	91.06	−3.30
Two-party-preferred result
Labor	Jordan Crugnale	25,982	52.39	+6.94
Liberal	Brian Paynter	23,607	47.61	−6.94
Labor gain from Liberal		Swing	+6.94	

==== 2014 ====
2014 Victorian state election: Bass
Party	Candidate	Votes	%	±%
Liberal	Brian Paynter	18,008	45.3	−10.2
Labor	Sanjay Nathan	11,659	29.4	+0.6
Independent	Clare Le Serve	4,289	10.8	+10.8
Greens	Ross Fairhurst	3,613	9.1	−2.6
Country Alliance	David Amor	969	2.4	−0.9
Christians	Paul Reid	651	1.6	+1.6
Rise Up Australia	Angela Dorian	524	1.3	+1.3
Total formal votes		39,713	94.6	−0.7
Informal votes		2,272	5.4	+0.7
Turnout		41,985	94.4	+6.1
Two-party-preferred result
Liberal	Brian Paynter	21,664	54.6	−7.8
Labor	Sanjay Nathan	18,049	45.4	+7.8
Liberal hold		Swing	−7.8	

==== 2010 ====
2010 Victorian state election: Bass
Party	Candidate	Votes	%	±%
Liberal	Ken Smith	25,098	56.46	+10.10
Labor	Gerry Lonergan	12,962	29.16	−5.83
Greens	Neil Rankine	4,845	10.90	+2.04
Country Alliance	Bruce Rogers	1,546	3.48	+3.48
Total formal votes		44,451	95.20	−0.25
Informal votes		2,243	4.80	+0.25
Turnout		46,694	94.75	+0.71
Two-party-preferred result
Liberal	Ken Smith	27,804	62.58	+7.06
Labor	Gerry Lonergan	16,662	37.42	−7.06
Liberal hold		Swing	+7.06	

=== Elections in the 2000s ===
==== 2006 ====
2006 Victorian state election: Bass
Party	Candidate	Votes	%	±%
Liberal	Ken Smith	16,584	46.36	+5.89
Labor	John Anderson	12,517	34.99	+6.98
Greens	Tully Fletcher	3,169	8.86	+3.48
Family First	Cameron Begg	1,613	4.51	+4.51
National	Jacky Abbott	1,275	3.56	+3.56
Independent	Cheryl Billing-Smith	611	1.71	+1.71
Total formal votes		35,769	95.45	−1.65
Informal votes		1,705	4.55	+1.65
Turnout		37,474	94.04	+0.05
Two-party-preferred result
Liberal	Ken Smith	19,882	55.52	+4.88
Labor	John Anderson	15,926	44.48	−4.88
Liberal hold		Swing	+4.88	

==== 2002 ====
2002 Victorian state election: Bass
Party	Candidate	Votes	%	±%
Liberal	Ken Smith	13,021	40.5	−4.1
Labor	John Anderson	9,012	28.0	+2.9
Independent	Susan Davies	7,014	21.8	−1.3
Greens	Nikki Ludlow	1,730	5.4	+3.3
Independent	Kay Nesbit	1,401	4.4	+4.4
Total formal votes		32,178	97.1	−0.2
Informal votes		962	2.9	+0.2
Turnout		33,140	94.0	
Two-party-preferred result
Liberal	Ken Smith	16,294	50.6	+4.2
Labor	John Anderson	15,884	49.4	+49.4
Liberal gain from Independent		Swing	+4.2	
