= Candidates of the 2002 Victorian state election =

The 2002 Victorian state election was held on 30 November 2002.

== Retiring Members ==
=== Labor ===
- Alex Andrianopoulos MLA (Mill Park)
- Keith Hamilton MLA (Morwell)

=== Liberal ===
- Robert Dean MLA (Berwick)
- Rob Maclellan MLA (Pakenham)
- John Richardson MLA (Forest Hill)
- Ross Smith MLA (Glen Waverley)
- Garry Spry MLA (Bellarine)
- Mark Birrell MLC (East Yarra)
- Bruce Chamberlain MLC (Western)
- Geoff Craige MLC (Central Highlands)
- John Ross MLC (Higinbotham)

=== National ===
- Don Kilgour MLA (Shepparton)
- Barry Steggall MLA (Swan Hill)
- Ron Best MLC (North Western)
- Roger Hallam MLC (Western)

== Legislative Assembly ==
Sitting members are shown in bold text. Successful candidates are highlighted in the relevant colour. Where there is possible confusion, an asterisk (*) is also used.

Electorate	Held by	Labor candidates	Coalition candidates	Greens candidates	Other candidates
Albert Park	Labor	**John Thwaites**	Virginia Browne (Lib)	John Middleton	Melanie Oke (Ind)
Altona	Labor	**Lynne Kosky**	Steve Lambrinakos (Lib)	Tony Briffa	
Ballarat East	Labor	**Geoff Howard**	Gerard FitzGerald (Lib)	Scott Kinnear	Valiant Halborg (CEC); Suresh Pathy (Ind)
Ballarat West	Labor	**Karen Overington**	Judy Verlin (Lib)	Faye Backstrom	Rob Donker (CDP); Geoff Sullivan (Ind)
Bass	Liberal	John Anderson	Ken Smith (Lib)	Nikki Ludlow	**Susan Davies** (Ind); Kay Nesbit (Ind)
Bayswater	Liberal	Peter Lockwood	**Gordon Ashley** (Lib)	Jill Bannan	
Bellarine	Liberal	Lisa Neville	Frank Kelloway	Catherine Jones	
Benalla	Labor	**Denise Allen**	Andrew Dwyer (Lib); Bill Sykes* (Nat)	Peter Stewart	
Benambra	Liberal	Barb Murdoch	**Tony Plowman*** (Lib); Geoff Reid (Nat)	Helen Lucas	Hannah Seymour (CDP)
Bendigo East	Labor	**Jacinta Allan**	Lisa Ruffell (Lib); Tracee Spiby (Nat)	David Petersen	
Bendigo West	Labor	**Bob Cameron**	Geoff Austerberry (Lib); Robin Taylor (Nat)	Doug Ralph	
Bentleigh	Liberal	Rob Hudson	**Inga Peulich** (Lib)	Penny Mitchell	Simon Hall (CEC)
Box Hill	Liberal	Robert Chong	**Robert Clark** (Lib)	Helen Harris	
Brighton	Liberal	Rachelle Sapir	**Louise Asher** (Lib)	Clive Davies	
Broadmeadows	Labor	**John Brumby**	Bentleigh Gibson (Lib)	Karin Geradts	Joseph Kaliniy (Ind); Sleiman Yohanna (CEC)
Brunswick	Labor	**Carlo Carli**	Rebecca Gauci (Lib)	Pamela Curr	Steven Bird (CEC); Judy McVey (SA); Tony Morton (Ind); Ken Taylor (Ind)
Bulleen	Liberal	Chris Miras	**Nicholas Kotsiras** (Lib)	Matthew Wright	
Bundoora	Labor	**Sherryl Garbutt**	Melanie Randall (Lib)	Gayle McDonald	Walter Mellado (CEC)
Burwood	Labor	**Bob Stensholt**	Di Rule (Lib)	Josephine Lee	Tom Morrissey (Ind)
Carrum	Labor	**Jenny Lindell**	Ross MacInnes (Lib)	Darren Bujeya	Michael Good (Ind)
Caulfield	Liberal	Harry Simon	**Helen Shardey** (Lib)	Ronen Becker	
Clayton	Labor	**Hong Lim**	Andrew Wong (Lib)	George Kirby	Daniel Berk (Dem)
Cranbourne	Labor	Jude Perera	**Gary Rowe** (Lib)	Gareth Kennedy	Heather Stanton (CEC)
Dandenong	Labor	**John Pandazopoulos**	John Kelly (Lib)	Maree Kelly	Janet Cox (Ind); Earle Keegel (Ind)
Derrimut	Labor	**Telmo Languiller**	Adrian Lim (Lib)		Andre Kozlowski (CEC)
Doncaster	Liberal	Kate Dunn	**Victor Perton** (Lib)	Kerry Dawborn	
Eltham	Liberal	Steve Herbert	**Wayne Phillips** (Lib)	Merinda Gray	
Essendon	Labor	**Judy Maddigan**	Steve Reynolds (Lib)	Victor Lewis-Hansom	Colin Horne (CEC)
Evelyn	Liberal	Heather McTaggart	**Christine Fyffe** (Lib)	Rob Hay	Gabriela Byrne (Ind)
Ferntree Gully	Liberal	Anne Eckstein	**Hurtle Lupton** (Lib)	Stephen Bullock	
Footscray	Labor	**Bruce Mildenhall**	Conrad D'Souza (Lib)	Janet Rice	Catherine Cumming (Ind); Justine Kamprad (SA); Martin Nguyen (Ind)
Forest Hill	Liberal	Kirstie Marshall	Vasan Srinivasan (Lib)	Adam Pepper	Rodney Campbell (Ind); Noel Spurr (Ind)
Frankston	Liberal	Alistair Harkness	**Andrea McCall** (Lib)	Henry Kelsall	Carolyn Chapple (CEC)
Geelong	Liberal	**Ian Trezise**	Stretch Kontelj (Lib)	Elsie Teer	Andrea Battistella (Ind); Miles Hodge (Ind); Richard Nixon (Ind)
Gembrook	Liberal	Tammy Lobato	Neil Lucas (Lib)	Noel Ridgway	Frank Dean (Ind)
Gippsland East	Independent	Terry Grange	Darren Chester (Nat); Leigh Dent (Lib)	Kevin Thiele	Ben Buckley (Ind); **Craig Ingram*** (Ind); Jacqueline McKeown (Ind)
Gippsland South	National	Gregg Cook	Jim Forbes (Lib); **Peter Ryan*** (Nat)	Chris Aitken	
Hastings	Liberal	Rosy Buchanan	Neale Burgess (Lib)	Willem Olivier	Henry Broadbent (CEC)
Hawthorn	Liberal	Avis Meddings	**Ted Baillieu** (Lib)	Tania Giles	
Ivanhoe	Labor	**Craig Langdon**	Peter Nolan (Lib)	Glen Doreian	Martin Appleby (Ind); Anna Morton (Ind); Gary Schorel-Hlavka (Ind)
Keilor	Labor	**George Seitz**	Darren Buller (Lib)	Steve Nosal	
Kew	Liberal	Maree Williams	**Andrew McIntosh** (Lib)	Cheryl Clark	Mary Dettman (Dem)
Kilsyth	Liberal	Dympna Beard	**Lorraine Elliott** (Lib)	Lorraine Leach	
Kororoit	Labor	**Andre Haermeyer**	Joe Fenech (Lib)		Amanda George (Ind); Bernard Reilly (Ind)
Lara	Labor	**Peter Loney**	Linda Ristevski (Lib)	Kim Baranowski	Brigitte Ellery (SA)
Lowan	National	Charles Williams	**Hugh Delahunty*** (Nat); Howard Templeton (Lib)	David Brain	
Lyndhurst	Labor	**Tim Holding**	Alan Hood (Lib)	Theos Patrinos	Gordon Ford (Ind)
Macedon	Liberal	**Joanne Duncan**	Bernie Finn (Lib)	Marcus Ward	Bradley Scott (CEC)
Malvern	Liberal	Rolf Sorensen	**Robert Doyle** (Lib)	Robert Trafficante	Norman Pollack (Ind)
Melbourne	Labor	**Bronwyn Pike**	Sue Bourke (Lib)	Richard Di Natale	Jeremy Beck (CEC); Michael Cebon (Ind); Kevin Chamberlin (Ind); Maxine Fensom (Ind); Arun Pradhan (SA)
Melton	Labor	**Don Nardella**	Richard Gough (Lib)	Ken Stewart	John Goodman (Ind); John Hyett (Ind); Frank McColl (Ind); Terry Muscat (Ind)
Mildura	Independent	John Zigouras	Tom Crouch (Nat); Stan Sleep (Lib)	Bruce Rivendell	Tony Cursaro (Ind); **Russell Savage*** (Ind)
Mill Park	Labor	Lily D'Ambrosio	Lucas Kostadinoski (Lib)	Berhan Ahmed	Brian Mawhinney (Dem)
Mitcham	Labor	**Tony Robinson**	Russell Hannan (Lib)	Bill Pemberton	Liz Turner (Ind); Kaele Way (Ind)
Monbulk	Liberal	James Merlino	**Steve McArthur** (Lib)	Craig Smith	Tony Holland (Dem); Wolf Voigt (CDP)
Mordialloc	Liberal	Janice Munt	**Geoff Leigh** (Lib)	Shaun Monagle	Frank Gigliotti (CEC)
Mornington	Liberal	Judith Graley	**Robin Cooper** (Lib)	Paula Johnson	
Morwell	Labor	Brendan Jenkins	Diane Blackwood (Lib); Jenny Hammett (Nat)	Catheryn Thompson	Harry Alexander (Ind); Brad Platschinda (Ind)
Mount Waverley	Liberal	Maxine Morand	**Ron Wilson** (Lib)	John Poppins	Therese Bennett (Dem); Matthew Bond (Ind)
Mulgrave	Labor	Daniel Andrews	Chris Kelly (Lib)	Colin Smith	Dikran Chabdjian (Ind)
Murray Valley	National	Lauren O'Neill	**Ken Jasper*** (Nat); Don Joyce (Lib)	Trisha Scott	
Narracan	Liberal	**Ian Maxfield**	Ian Needham (Nat); Karen Stoll (Lib)	Kate Jackson	Tony Sayers (Ind)
Narre Warren North	Liberal	Luke Donnellan	Maree Luckins (Lib)	Glen Haywood	
Narre Warren South	Liberal	Dale Wilson	Michael Shepherdson (Lib)	Thom Lyons	
Nepean	Liberal	Carole Ford	**Martin Dixon** (Lib)	David De Rango	
Niddrie	Labor	**Rob Hulls**	Susan Jennison (Lib)	Matthew Klugman	Pat Crea (DLP)
Northcote	Labor	**Mary Delahunty**	Graham Watt (Lib)	Sarah Nicholson	Paul Gallagher (CEC); Jackie Lynch (SA)
Oakleigh	Labor	**Ann Barker**	Peter Goudge (Lib)	Ollie Bennett	Tina Skouzis (Ind)
Pascoe Vale	Labor	**Christine Campbell**	Steve Clancy (Lib)	Peter Elgood	Craig Isherwood (CEC)
Polwarth	Liberal	Steve Gartland	Doug Chant (Nat); **Terry Mulder*** (Lib)	Natalie Atherden	Andrew Mitchell (Ind)
Prahran	Liberal	Tony Lupton	**Leonie Burke** (Lib)	Dinesh Mathew	John Gourlay (Dem); Abraham Lincoln (Ind)
Preston	Labor	**Michael Leighton**	Lawrence Dean (Lib)	Chris Chaplin	Noelene Isherwood (CEC)
Richmond	Labor	**Richard Wynne**	Paul Teiwes (Lib)	Gemma Pinnell	Stephen Jolly (Ind); Paul Mees (Ind)
Ripon	Labor	**Joe Helper**	Rob de Fegely (Lib); Kevin Erwin (Nat)	Phil Millar	John McCallum (Ind)
Rodney	National	Malcolm McCullough	Simon Frost (Lib); **Noel Maughan*** (Nat)	Peter Williams	Greg Toll (Ind)
Sandringham	Liberal	Justin Caruana	**Murray Thompson** (Lib)	Sam Watkins	Nicholas Eden (Ind)
Scoresby	Liberal	Pollyanne Williams	**Kim Wells** (Lib)	Genevieve O'Connell	
Seymour	Labor	**Ben Hardman**	Mike Dalmau (Lib)	Chelsea McNab	
Shepparton	National	Alan Calder	Stephen Merrylees (Lib); Jeanette Powell* (Nat)	John Griffiths	Chris Hazelman (Ind)
South Barwon	Liberal	Michael Crutchfield	**Alister Paterson** (Lib)	Iain Lygo	Eric Bullmore (Ind); Andrew Hepner (Ind)
South-West Coast	Liberal	Roy Reekie	Gerald Madden (Nat); **Denis Napthine*** (Lib)	Gillian Blair	
Swan Hill	National	Graeme Hill	Suellen Tomamichel (Lib); Peter Walsh* (Nat)	Jacquie Kelly	Rob Sonogan (Ind)
Tarneit	Labor	**Mary Gillett**	James Hanrahan (Lib)		Christine Hudson (Ind)
Thomastown	Labor	**Peter Batchelor**	Adam Woolcock (Lib)	Zhivan Rendevski	
Warrandyte	Liberal	Jarrod Panther	**Phil Honeywood** (Lib)	Barry Watson	Tim Petherbridge (HPA)
Williamstown	Labor	**Steve Bracks**	Alan Evers-Buckland (Lib)	Michele Finey	John Westbury (Ind)
Yan Yean	Liberal	Danielle Green	Matthew Guy (Lib)	Patrick Vaughan	Simon Steer (CEC)
Yuroke	Labor	**Liz Beattie**	Robert Dunstan (Lib)		Tanzir Chowdhury (CEC)

== Legislative Council ==
Sitting members are shown in bold text. Successful candidates are highlighted in the relevant colour. Where there is possible confusion, an asterisk (*) is also used.

Province	Held by	Labor candidates	Coalition candidates	Greens candidates	Democrats candidates	Other candidates
Ballarat	Labor	**John McQuilten**	Helen Bath (Lib)	Cherie Bridges	Geoff Lutz	
Central Highlands	Liberal	Rob Mitchell	Cath Marriott (Lib); Rozi Parisotto (Nat)	Janet MacKenzie	Jos Vandersman	
Chelsea	Liberal	Matt Viney	Vanthilda Lao (Lib)	Hilary Bray	Wendy Thacker	
Doutta Galla	Labor	**Monica Gould**	Christina Tutone (Lib)	Jules Beckwith	Robert Livesay	
East Yarra	Liberal	Tom Wilson	**David Davis** (Lib)	Peter Campbell	Kent Winzer	Bill French (Ind); Ronald Haack (HPA)
East Yarra	Liberal	Will Fowles	Richard Dalla-Riva (Lib)	Wendy Salter	Ari Sharp	
Eumemmering	Liberal	Adem Somyurek	Mick Morland (Lib)	Val Kay		
Geelong	Liberal	John Eren	**Ian Cover** (Lib)	Bruce Murray	Erica Menheere-Thompson	Alan Barron (CDP); Val Nicholls (Ind)
Gippsland	National	Don Wishart	**Peter Hall*** (Nat); Peter Tyler (Lib)	Madelon Lane	Jo McCubbin	
Higinbotham	Liberal	Noel Pullen	Michael Heffernan (Lib)	Tony McDermott	Derek Wilson	
Jika Jika	Labor	**Theo Theophanous**	Thomas Flitner (Lib)	Alexandra Bhathal	Jess Healy	
Koonung	Liberal	Helen Buckingham	**Gerald Ashman** (Lib)	Mick Kir		Jenny Manassa (HPA)
Melbourne	Labor	**Gavin Jennings**	Michael Christo (Lib)	Robyn Evans	Danii Coric	
Melbourne North	Labor	**Candy Broad**	Henry Buch (Lib)	David Cuthbertson	Penelope Robertson	
Melbourne West	Labor	**Sang Nguyen**	Peter Hammond (Lib)	Andrew Ellis	Barry Thomas	
Monash	Liberal	Johan Scheffer	**Peter Katsambanis** (Lib)	Jo Lewis	David Zemdegs	
North Eastern	National	Jackie Crothers	Kerrin Chambers (Nat); Wendy Lovell* (Lib)	Carol Kunert	Leanne Pleash	Phil Seymour (CDP)
North Western	National	Marg Lewis	Damian Drum* (Nat); Peter Kennedy (Lib)	Julie Rivendell		Laurie Whelan (Ind)
Silvan	Liberal	Carolyn Hirsh	**Wendy Smith** (Lib)	Michael Abson	Tony Carden	Leo Tischler (HPA)
Templestowe	Liberal	Lidia Argondizzo	**Carlo Furletti** (Lib)	Robyn Roberts		Lee-Anne Poynton (HPA); Reginald Temple (Ind)
Waverley	Labor	John Lenders	Denise McGill (Lib)	Heather Welsh	Polly Morgan	
Western	Liberal	Lesley Jackson	John Vogels* (Lib); Greg Walcott (Nat)	Viola Spokes		
Western	National	Stephen Clegg	David Koch* (Lib); David Miller (Nat)	Sally-Anne Brown		
Western Port	Liberal	Geoff Hilton	**Cameron Boardman** (Lib)	Ian Hutchison		

== See also ==
- Members of the Victorian Legislative Assembly, 2002-2006
- Members of the Victorian Legislative Council, 2002-2006
- 2002 Victorian state election
