= Results of the 2002 Victorian state election (Legislative Council) =

Australian state election results

Victorian state election, 30 November 2002 Legislative Council << 1999–2006 >>
| Enrolled voters | 3,228,466 | | | | |
| Votes cast | 3,006,200 | | Turnout | 93.12 | +0.17 |
| Informal votes | 110,422 | | Informal | 3.67 | +0.30 |
Summary of votes by party
| Party | Primary votes | % | Swing | Seats won | Seats held |
| Labor | 1,375,245 | 47.49 | +5.26 | 17 | 25 |
| Liberal | 999,392 | 34.51 | –5.19 | 3 | 14 |
| Greens | 314,697 | 10.87 | +8.64 | 0 | 0 |
| National | 126,419 | 4.37 | –2.91 | 2 | 5 |
| Democrats | 51,718 | 1.79 | –5.00 | 0 | 0 |
| Hope | 4,615 | 0.16 | +0.16 | 0 | 0 |
| Christian Democrats | 4,615 | 0.14 | –0.10 | 0 | 0 |
| Independent | 19,534 | 0.67 | –0.62 | 0 | 0 |
| Total | 2,895,778 | | | 22 | 44 |
Two-party-preferred
| Labor | 1,675,108 | 57.85 | +7.73 | | |
| Liberal | 1,220,258 | 42.15 | –7.73 | | |

Results: Labor 50-60% 60-70% 70-80% Liberal 50-60% National 50-60%

This is a list of Legislative Council results for the Victorian 2002 state election. 22 of the 44 seats were contested. This was the last election using single-member districts before the introduction of multi-member districts ahead of the 2006 election.

This was the last election as of 2022, where they had no party other than Labor, Liberal or National in the Legislative Council.

== Results by province ==
=== Ballarat ===
2002 Victorian state election: Ballarat Province
| Party | Candidate | Votes | % | ±% |
|---|---|---|---|---|
| Labor | John McQuilten | 72,519 | 52.5 | +3.0 |
| Liberal | Helen Bath | 48,645 | 35.2 | −10.5 |
| Greens | Cherie Bridges | 14,182 | 10.3 | +10.3 |
| Democrats | Geoff Lutz | 2,809 | 2.0 | −2.3 |
| Total formal votes | | 138,155 | 97.0 | 0.0 |
| Informal votes | | 4,317 | 3.0 | 0.0 |
| Turnout | | 142,472 | 94.5 | |
Two-party-preferred result
| Labor | John McQuilten | 84,713 | 61.3 | +9.0 |
| Liberal | Helen Bath | 53,426 | 38.7 | −9.0 |
| Labor hold | | Swing | +9.0 | |

=== Central Highlands ===
2002 Victorian state election: Central Highlands Province
| Party | Candidate | Votes | % | ±% |
|---|---|---|---|---|
| Labor | Rob Mitchell | 57,245 | 44.3 | +1.1 |
| Liberal | Cath Marriott | 48,352 | 37.4 | −16.6 |
| Greens | Janet MacKenzie | 12,206 | 9.4 | +8.4 |
| National | Rozi Parisotto | 9,563 | 7.4 | +6.5 |
| Democrats | Jos Vandersman | 1,925 | 1.5 | +0.8 |
| Total formal votes | | 129,291 | 96.7 | −0.2 |
| Informal votes | | 4,470 | 3.3 | +0.2 |
| Turnout | | 133,761 | 94.1 | |
Two-party-preferred result
| Labor | Rob Mitchell | 70,460 | 54.5 | +9.8 |
| Liberal | Cath Marriott | 58,831 | 45.5 | −9.8 |
| Labor gain from Liberal | | Swing | +9.8 | |

=== Chelsea ===
2002 Victorian state election: Chelsea Province
| Party | Candidate | Votes | % | ±% |
|---|---|---|---|---|
| Labor | Matt Viney | 69,508 | 54.0 | +5.5 |
| Liberal | Vanthida Lao | 42,715 | 33.2 | −11.9 |
| Greens | Hilary Bray | 11,904 | 9.3 | +8.7 |
| Democrats | Wendy Thacker | 4,525 | 3.5 | −0.5 |
| Total formal votes | | 128,652 | 96.1 | −0.2 |
| Informal votes | | 5,234 | 3.9 | +0.2 |
| Turnout | | 133,886 | 92.9 | |
Two-party-preferred result
| Labor | Matt Viney | 80,160 | 61.7 | +8.9 |
| Liberal | Vanthida Lao | 49,825 | 38.3 | −8.9 |
| Labor hold | | Swing | +8.9 | |

=== Doutta Galla ===
2002 Victorian state election: Doutta Galla Province
| Party | Candidate | Votes | % | ±% |
|---|---|---|---|---|
| Labor | Monica Gould | 84,236 | 66.1 | −0.4 |
| Liberal | Christina Tutone | 31,808 | 24.9 | −8.6 |
| Greens | Jules Beckwith | 8,714 | 6.8 | +6.8 |
| Democrats | Robert Livesay | 2,753 | 2.2 | +2.2 |
| Total formal votes | | 127,511 | 94.6 | −0.3 |
| Informal votes | | 7,210 | 5.4 | +0.3 |
| Turnout | | 134,721 | 93.1 | |
Two-party-preferred result
| Labor | Monica Gould | 91,581 | 71.9 | +5.5 |
| Liberal | Christina Tutone | 35,797 | 28.1 | −5.5 |
| Labor hold | | Swing | +5.5 | |

=== East Yarra ===
2002 Victorian state election: East Yarra Province
| Party | Candidate | Votes | % | ±% |
|---|---|---|---|---|
| Liberal | David Davis | 60,379 | 45.6 | −10.8 |
| Labor | Tom Wilson | 47,741 | 36.1 | +2.9 |
| Greens | Peter Campbell | 20,311 | 15.3 | +15.3 |
| Democrats | Kent Winzer | 2,097 | 1.6 | −8.8 |
| Independent | Bill French | 1,003 | 0.8 | +0.8 |
| Hope | Ronald Haack | 792 | 0.6 | +0.6 |
| Total formal votes | | 132,323 | 96.4 | −1.0 |
| Informal votes | | 4,940 | 3.6 | +1.0 |
| Turnout | | 137,263 | 92.9 | |
Two-party-preferred result
| Liberal | David Davis | 66,304 | 50.1 | −9.9 |
| Labor | Tom Wilson | 66,019 | 49.9 | +9.9 |
| Liberal hold | | Swing | −9.9 | |

=== Eumemmerring ===
2002 Victorian state election: Eumemmerring Province
| Party | Candidate | Votes | % | ±% |
|---|---|---|---|---|
| Labor | Adem Somyurek | 67,534 | 52.9 | +8.4 |
| Liberal | Mick Morland | 46,120 | 36.1 | −10.1 |
| Greens | Val Kay | 14,059 | 11.0 | +11.0 |
| Total formal votes | | 127,713 | 95.8 | −0.1 |
| Informal votes | | 5,546 | 4.2 | +0.1 |
| Turnout | | 133,259 | 93.4 | |
Two-party-preferred result
| Labor | Adem Somyurek | 76,438 | 59.9 | +10.5 |
| Liberal | Mick Morland | 51,230 | 40.1 | −10.5 |
| Labor gain from Liberal | | Swing | +10.5 | |

=== Geelong ===
2002 Victorian state election: Geelong Province
| Party | Candidate | Votes | % | ±% |
|---|---|---|---|---|
| Labor | John Eren | 72,683 | 51.2 | +5.7 |
| Liberal | Ian Cover | 51,059 | 36.0 | −9.2 |
| Greens | Bruce Murray | 11,904 | 8.4 | +4.3 |
| Democrats | Erica Menheere-Thompson | 3,255 | 2.3 | −2.9 |
| Christian Democrats | Alan Barron | 1,826 | 1.3 | +1.3 |
| Independent | Val Nicholls | 1,144 | 0.8 | +0.8 |
| Total formal votes | | 141,871 | 97.0 | −0.5 |
| Informal votes | | 4,395 | 3.0 | +0.5 |
| Turnout | | 146,266 | 94.3 | |
Two-party-preferred result
| Labor | John Eren | 86,253 | 60.8 | +8.8 |
| Liberal | Ian Cover | 55,564 | 39.2 | −8.8 |
| Labor gain from Liberal | | Swing | +8.8 | |

=== Gippsland ===
2002 Victorian state election: Gippsland Province
| Party | Candidate | Votes | % | ±% |
|---|---|---|---|---|
| Labor | Don Wishart | 52,917 | 39.5 | +0.8 |
| National | Peter Hall | 36,086 | 27.0 | +27.0 |
| Liberal | Peter Tyler | 31,120 | 23.3 | −17.6 |
| Greens | Madelon Lane | 9,910 | 7.4 | +7.0 |
| Democrats | Jo McCubbin | 3,767 | 2.8 | −3.0 |
| Total formal votes | | 133,800 | 96.6 | 0.0 |
| Informal votes | | 4,674 | 3.4 | 0.0 |
| Turnout | | 138,474 | 94.0 | |
Two-party-preferred result
| National | Peter Hall | 69,590 | 52.0 | +0.1 |
| Labor | Don Wishart | 64,210 | 48.0 | −0.1 |
| National hold | | Swing | +0.1 | |

=== Higinbotham ===
2002 Victorian state election: Higinbotham Province
| Party | Candidate | Votes | % | ±% |
|---|---|---|---|---|
| Liberal | Michael Heffernan | 60,580 | 45.7 | −10.1 |
| Labor | Noel Pullen | 52,445 | 39.6 | +36.9 |
| Greens | Tony McDermott | 16,451 | 12.4 | +12.4 |
| Democrats | Derek Wilson | 2,952 | 2.2 | −39.1 |
| Total formal votes | | 132,428 | 97.2 | +0.3 |
| Informal votes | | 3,845 | 2.8 | −0.3 |
| Turnout | | 136,273 | 92.7 | |
Two-party-preferred result
| Labor | Noel Pullen | 66,711 | 50.4 | +6.5 |
| Liberal | Michael Heffernan | 65,717 | 49.6 | −6.5 |
| Labor gain from Liberal | | Swing | +6.5 | |

=== Jika Jika ===
2002 Victorian state election: Jika Jika Province
| Party | Candidate | Votes | % | ±% |
|---|---|---|---|---|
| Labor | Theo Theophanous | 78,149 | 59.9 | −5.8 |
| Liberal | Thomas Flitner | 28,160 | 21.6 | −12.5 |
| Greens | Alexandra Bhathal | 18,914 | 14.5 | +14.5 |
| Democrats | Jess Healy | 5,261 | 4.0 | +3.9 |
| Total formal votes | | 130,484 | 95.7 | −0.3 |
| Informal votes | | 5,798 | 4.3 | +0.3 |
| Turnout | | 136,282 | 92.8 | |
Two-party-preferred result
| Labor | Theo Theophanous | 98,031 | 75.1 | +9.2 |
| Liberal | Thomas Flitner | 32,424 | 24.9 | −9.2 |
| Labor hold | | Swing | +9.2 | |

=== Koonung ===
2002 Victorian state election: Koonung Province
| Party | Candidate | Votes | % | ±% |
|---|---|---|---|---|
| Labor | Helen Buckingham | 64,757 | 47.2 | +9.7 |
| Liberal | Gerald Ashman | 58,338 | 42.5 | −11.4 |
| Greens | Mick Kir | 12,598 | 9.2 | +6.2 |
| Hope | Jenny Manassa | 1,583 | 1.2 | +1.2 |
| Total formal votes | | 137,276 | 96.9 | −0.4 |
| Informal votes | | 4,421 | 3.1 | +0.4 |
| Turnout | | 141,697 | 94.2 | |
Two-party-preferred result
| Labor | Helen Buckingham | 74,853 | 54.5 | +11.7 |
| Liberal | Gerald Ashman | 62,423 | 45.5 | −11.7 |
| Labor gain from Liberal | | Swing | +11.7 | |

=== Melbourne ===
2002 Victorian state election: Melbourne Province
| Party | Candidate | Votes | % | ±% |
|---|---|---|---|---|
| Labor | Gavin Jennings | 61,810 | 48.7 | −6.7 |
| Greens | Robyn Evans | 31,481 | 24.8 | +24.8 |
| Liberal | Michael Christo | 30,771 | 24.2 | −10.0 |
| Democrats | Danii Coric | 2,878 | 2.3 | −8.0 |
| Total formal votes | | 126,940 | 96.5 | +0.4 |
| Informal votes | | 4,652 | 3.5 | −0.4 |
| Turnout | | 131,592 | 90.0 | |
Two-party-preferred result
| Labor | Gavin Jennings | 67,059 | 52.8 | −10.6 |
| Greens | Robyn Evans | 59,881 | 47.2 | +47.2 |
| Labor hold | | Swing | −10.6 | |

=== Melbourne North ===
2002 Victorian state election: Melbourne North Province
| Party | Candidate | Votes | % | ±% |
|---|---|---|---|---|
| Labor | Candy Broad | 90,720 | 69.4 | +4.3 |
| Liberal | Henry Buch | 25,976 | 19.9 | −11.4 |
| Greens | David Cuthbertson | 10,674 | 8.2 | +8.2 |
| Democrats | Penelope Robertson | 3,333 | 2.6 | +2.0 |
| Total formal votes | | 130,703 | 94.7 | 0.0 |
| Informal votes | | 7,276 | 5.3 | 0.0 |
| Turnout | | 137,979 | 92.5 | |
Two-party-preferred result
| Labor | Candy Broad | 101,705 | 77.8 | +10.7 |
| Liberal | Henry Buch | 28,979 | 22.2 | −10.7 |
| Labor hold | | Swing | +10.7 | |

=== Melbourne West ===
2002 Victorian state election: Melbourne West Province
| Party | Candidate | Votes | % | ±% |
|---|---|---|---|---|
| Labor | Sang Nguyen | 78,617 | 60.4 | −0.7 |
| Liberal | Peter Hammond | 32,350 | 24.9 | −8.2 |
| Greens | Andrew Ellis | 15,007 | 11.5 | +11.5 |
| Democrats | Barry Thomas | 4,123 | 3.2 | −2.6 |
| Total formal votes | | 130,097 | 95.4 | −0.3 |
| Informal votes | | 6,314 | 4.6 | +0.3 |
| Turnout | | 136,411 | 92.3 | |
Two-party-preferred result
| Labor | Sang Nguyen | 91,780 | 70.6 | +5.7 |
| Liberal | Peter Hammond | 38,237 | 29.4 | −5.7 |
| Labor hold | | Swing | +5.7 | |

=== Monash ===
2002 Victorian state election: Monash Province
| Party | Candidate | Votes | % | ±% |
|---|---|---|---|---|
| Liberal | Peter Katsambanis | 55,855 | 43.5 | −8.1 |
| Labor | Johan Scheffer | 46,697 | 36.3 | −1.2 |
| Greens | Jo Lewis | 23,154 | 18.0 | +18.0 |
| Democrats | David Zemdegs | 2,795 | 2.2 | −5.3 |
| Total formal votes | | 128,501 | 97.0 | +0.2 |
| Informal votes | | 4,015 | 3.0 | −0.2 |
| Turnout | | 132,516 | 89.2 | |
Two-party-preferred result
| Labor | Johan Scheffer | 66,740 | 51.9 | +7.5 |
| Liberal | Peter Katsambanis | 61,761 | 48.1 | −7.5 |
| Labor gain from Liberal | | Swing | +7.5 | |

=== North Eastern ===
2002 Victorian state election: North Eastern Province
| Party | Candidate | Votes | % | ±% |
|---|---|---|---|---|
| Liberal | Wendy Lovell | 41,725 | 33.3 | +32.4 |
| Labor | Jackie Crothers | 40,279 | 32.2 | −3.4 |
| National | Kerrin Chambers | 30,134 | 24.1 | −31.4 |
| Greens | Carol Kunert | 7,243 | 5.8 | +5.8 |
| Democrats | Leanne Pleash | 3,465 | 2.8 | −5.2 |
| Christian Democrats | Phil Seymour | 2,332 | 1.9 | +1.9 |
| Total formal votes | | 125,178 | 95.7 | −1.2 |
| Informal votes | | 5,576 | 4.3 | +1.2 |
| Turnout | | 130,754 | 93.3 | |
Two-party-preferred result
| Liberal | Wendy Lovell | 73,538 | 58.7 | +58.7 |
| Labor | Jackie Crothers | 51,640 | 41.3 | +1.4 |
| Liberal gain from National | | Swing | N/A | |

=== North Western ===
2002 Victorian state election: North Western Province
| Party | Candidate | Votes | % | ±% |
|---|---|---|---|---|
| Labor | Marg Lewis | 47,302 | 36.1 | −4.6 |
| National | Damian Drum | 30,494 | 23.2 | −27.2 |
| Liberal | Peter Kennedy | 29,776 | 22.7 | +21.0 |
| Independent | Laurie Whelan | 16,308 | 12.4 | +12.4 |
| Greens | Julie Rivendell | 7,328 | 5.6 | +5.6 |
| Total formal votes | | 131,208 | 96.7 | −1.0 |
| Informal votes | | 4,472 | 3.3 | +1.0 |
| Turnout | | 135,680 | 93.8 | |
Two-party-preferred result
| National | Damian Drum | 66,200 | 50.5 | −5.3 |
| Labor | Marg Lewis | 65,008 | 49.5 | +5.3 |
| National hold | | Swing | −5.3 | |

=== Silvan ===
2002 Victorian state election: Silvan Province
| Party | Candidate | Votes | % | ±% |
|---|---|---|---|---|
| Liberal | Wendy Smith | 59,906 | 44.4 | −8.4 |
| Labor | Carolyn Hirsh | 56,588 | 41.9 | +3.5 |
| Greens | Michael Abson | 14,793 | 11.0 | +10.7 |
| Democrats | Tony Carden | 2,333 | 1.7 | −4.1 |
| Hope | Leo Tischler | 1,347 | 1.0 | +1.0 |
| Total formal votes | | 134,967 | 96.7 | −0.4 |
| Informal votes | | 4,549 | 3.3 | +0.4 |
| Turnout | | 139,516 | 93.5 | |
Two-party-preferred result
| Labor | Carolyn Hirsh | 69,885 | 51.8 | +8.3 |
| Liberal | Wendy Smith | 65,082 | 48.2 | −8.3 |
| Labor gain from Liberal | | Swing | +8.3 | |

=== Templestowe ===
2002 Victorian state election: Templestowe Province
| Party | Candidate | Votes | % | ±% |
|---|---|---|---|---|
| Labor | Lidia Argondizzo | 56,952 | 43.5 | +42.1 |
| Liberal | Carlo Furletti | 54,670 | 41.7 | −11.8 |
| Greens | Robyn Roberts | 17,469 | 13.3 | −21.5 |
| Independent | Reginald Temple | 1,079 | 0.8 | +0.8 |
| Hope | Lee-Anne Poynton | 893 | 0.7 | +0.7 |
| Total formal votes | | 131,063 | 96.2 | −0.8 |
| Informal votes | | 5,195 | 3.8 | +0.8 |
| Turnout | | 136,258 | 93.7 | |
Two-party-preferred result
| Labor | Lidia Argondizzo | 70,611 | 53.9 | +9.6 |
| Liberal | Carlo Furletti | 60,452 | 46.1 | −9.6 |
| Labor gain from Liberal | | Swing | +9.6 | |

=== Waverley ===
2002 Victorian state election: Waverley Province
| Party | Candidate | Votes | % | ±% |
|---|---|---|---|---|
| Labor | John Lenders | 67,950 | 54.0 | +6.2 |
| Liberal | Denise McGill | 43,226 | 34.3 | −9.7 |
| Greens | Heather Welsh | 11,238 | 8.9 | +8.8 |
| Democrats | Polly Morgan | 3,447 | 2.7 | −4.3 |
| Total formal votes | | 125,861 | 96.2 | +0.4 |
| Informal votes | | 4,915 | 3.8 | −0.4 |
| Turnout | | 130,776 | 92.9 | |
Two-party-preferred result
| Labor | John Lenders | 78,478 | 62.4 | +9.8 |
| Liberal | Denise McGill | 47,362 | 37.6 | −9.8 |
| Labor hold | | Swing | +9.8 | |

=== Western ===
2002 Victorian state election: Western Province
| Party | Candidate | Votes | % | ±% |
|---|---|---|---|---|
| Liberal | John Vogels | 56,497 | 40.0 | +32.5 |
| Labor | Lesley Jackson | 54,815 | 38.8 | +0.8 |
| National | Greg Walcott | 20,142 | 14.3 | −34.9 |
| Greens | Viola Spokes | 9,823 | 7.0 | +7.0 |
| Total formal votes | | 141,277 | 96.8 | −0.8 |
| Informal votes | | 4,611 | 3.2 | +0.8 |
| Turnout | | 145,888 | 94.9 | |
Two-party-preferred result
| Liberal | John Vogels | 76,772 | 54.3 | −4.7 |
| Labor | Lesley Jackson | 64,505 | 45.7 | +4.7 |
| Liberal hold | | Swing | −4.7 | |

=== Western Port ===
2002 Victorian state election: Western Port Province
| Party | Candidate | Votes | % | ±% |
|---|---|---|---|---|
| Liberal | Cameron Boardman | 61,364 | 47.0 | −7.1 |
| Labor | Geoff Hilton | 53,781 | 41.2 | +4.8 |
| Greens | Ian Hutchison | 15,334 | 11.8 | +7.9 |
| Total formal votes | | 130,479 | 97.0 | −0.3 |
| Informal votes | | 3,997 | 3.0 | +0.3 |
| Turnout | | 134,476 | 93.6 | |
Two-party-preferred result
| Labor | Geoff Hilton | 65,441 | 50.2 | +8.5 |
| Liberal | Cameron Boardman | 65,030 | 49.8 | −8.5 |
| Labor gain from Liberal | | Swing | +8.5 | |

== By-elections ==
2002 Victorian Legislative Council by-elections
- 30 November 2002

2 seats in the Legislative Council
| | First party | Second party |
|---|---|---|
| Party | Liberal | National |
| Seats before | 1 | 1 |
| Seats won | 2 | 0 |
| Seat change | ▲1 | ▼1 |

There were a total of 2 Legislative Council by-elections that took place on election day following the resignation of MLCs elected at the 1999 election.

=== East Yarra ===
2002 Victorian state election: East Yarra by-election
| Party | Candidate | Votes | % | ±% |
|---|---|---|---|---|
| Liberal | Richard Dalla-Riva | 58,145 | 45.8 | −11.0 |
| Labor | Will Fowles | 43,964 | 34.6 | +1.8 |
| Greens | Wendy Salter | 21,096 | 16.6 | +16.6 |
| Democrats | Ari Sharp | 3,805 | 3.0 | −7.4 |
| Total formal votes | | 127,010 | 97.0 | −0.5 |
| Informal votes | | 3,933 | 3.0 | +0.5 |
| Turnout | | 130,943 | 92.6 | |
Two-party-preferred result
| Liberal | Richard Dalla-Riva | 65,500 | 51.5 | −8.8 |
| Labor | Will Fowles | 61,634 | 48.5 | +8.8 |
| Liberal hold | | Swing | −8.8 | |

This election followed the vacancy caused by the resignation of Mark Birrell, who resigned. The by-election was conducted on the same day as the 2002 election, but used the old electoral boundaries.

=== Western ===
2002 Victorian state election: Western by-election
| Party | Candidate | Votes | % | ±% |
|---|---|---|---|---|
| Liberal | David Koch | 46,321 | 38.8 | +38.8 |
| Labor | Stephen Clegg | 40,984 | 34.3 | −0.7 |
| National | David Miller | 21,263 | 17.8 | −41.7 |
| Greens | Sally-Anne Brown | 10,973 | 9.2 | +9.2 |
| Total formal votes | | 119,541 | 96.7 | −1.1 |
| Informal votes | | 4,019 | 3.3 | +1.1 |
| Turnout | | 123,560 | 94.5 | |
Two-party-preferred result
| Liberal | David Koch | 66,953 | 56.0 | +56.0 |
| Labor | Stephen Clegg | 52,588 | 44.0 | +5.9 |
| Liberal gain from National | | Swing | N/A | |

This election followed the vacancy caused by the resignation of Roger Hallam, who resigned. The by-election was conducted on the same day as the 2002 election, but used the old electoral boundaries.

== See also ==
- 2002 Victorian state election
- Candidates of the 2002 Victorian state election
