= Electoral results for the district of Gembrook =

Australian district election results

This is a list of electoral results for the Electoral district of Gembrook in Victorian state elections.

== Members for Gembrook ==
Member	Party	Term
Tammy Lobato	Labor	2002–2010
Brad Battin	Liberal	2010–2022

== Election results ==
=== Elections in the 2010s ===
==== 2018 ====
2018 Victorian state election: Gembrook
Party	Candidate	Votes	%	±%
Liberal	Brad Battin	21,202	48.26	−6.42
Labor	Michael Galea	18,065	41.12	+10.48
Greens	Amy Gregorovich	4,667	10.62	+2.16
Total formal votes		43,934	94.46	−0.25
Informal votes		2,575	5.54	+0.25
Turnout		46,509	91.07	−3.31
Two-party-preferred result
Liberal	Brad Battin	22,313	50.79	−8.16
Labor	Michael Galea	21,621	49.21	+8.16
Liberal hold		Swing	−8.16	

==== 2014 ====
2014 Victorian state election: Gembrook
Party	Candidate	Votes	%	±%
Liberal	Brad Battin	20,646	54.7	+1.2
Labor	Collin Ross	11,568	30.6	−2.3
Greens	Michael Schilling	3,197	8.5	+0.3
Christians	Simon Beard	659	1.7	+1.7
Independent	Damian Heffernan	519	1.4	+1.4
Country Alliance	Alan Stoops	518	1.4	−0.0
Rise Up Australia	Ferdie Verdan	406	1.1	+1.1
Independent	Frank Dean	248	0.7	+0.3
Total formal votes		37,761	94.7	−0.0
Informal votes		2,106	5.3	+0.0
Turnout		39,867	94.4	+7.9
Two-party-preferred result
Liberal	Brad Battin	22,324	59.0	+0.2
Labor	Collin Ross	15,545	41.0	−0.2
Liberal hold		Swing	+0.2	

==== 2010 ====
2010 Victorian state election: Gembrook
Party	Candidate	Votes	%	±%
Liberal	Brad Battin	18,427	47.93	+7.77
Labor	Tammy Lobato	12,638	32.87	−6.35
Greens	Brent Hall	3,689	9.60	−1.42
Family First	Rebecca Filliponi	1,032	2.68	−1.08
National	Peter McConachy	904	2.35	−1.60
Country Alliance	Alex Krstic	871	2.27	+2.27
Democratic Labor	Larry Norman	372	0.97	+0.97
Independent	Hayden Ostrom Brown	227	0.59	+0.59
Independent	Frank Dean	145	0.38	−0.40
Independent	Robert Belcher	142	0.37	+0.37
Total formal votes		38,447	94.20	−1.54
Informal votes		2,366	5.80	+1.54
Turnout		40,813	94.02	+0.03
Two-party-preferred result
Liberal	Brad Battin	21,926	56.75	+7.35
Labor	Tammy Lobato	16,707	43.25	−7.35
Liberal gain from Labor		Swing	+7.35	

=== Elections in the 2000s ===
==== 2006 ====
2006 Victorian state election: Gembrook
Party	Candidate	Votes	%	±%
Liberal	Simon Wildes	13,994	40.2	−3.7
Labor	Tammy Lobato	13,666	39.2	−2.3
Greens	Gordon Watson	3,838	11.0	−1.8
National	Peter McConachy	1,375	3.9	+3.9
Family First	Peter Gebbing	1,309	3.8	+3.8
People Power	Robyn Allcock	388	1.1	+1.1
Independent	Frank Dean	272	0.8	−1.0
Total formal votes		34,842	95.7	−1.0
Informal votes		1,551	4.3	+1.0
Turnout		36,393	94.0	+0.1
Two-party-preferred result
Labor	Tammy Lobato	17,670	50.7	−0.9
Liberal	Simon Wildes	17,172	49.3	+0.9
Labor hold		Swing	−0.9	

==== 2002 ====
2002 Victorian state election: Gembrook
Party	Candidate	Votes	%	±%
Liberal	Neil Lucas	13,814	43.9	−8.7
Labor	Tammy Lobato	13,054	41.5	+5.2
Greens	Noel Ridgway	4,018	12.8	+7.6
Independent	Frank Dean	553	1.8	+0.7
Total formal votes		31,439	96.8	−0.8
Informal votes		1,044	3.2	+0.8
Turnout		32,483	93.9	
Two-party-preferred result
Labor	Tammy Lobato	16,217	51.6	+8.3
Liberal	Neil Lucas	15,222	48.4	−8.3
Labor gain from Liberal		Swing	+8.3	
