= Geoff Sullivan =

Geoff(rey) Sullivan may refer to:

- Geoff Sullivan (fictional character) in The Sullivans
- Geoff Sullivan (politician), one of the Candidates of the Victorian state election, 2002
- Geoffrey Sullivan, character in List of Unsolved Mysteries episodes

== See also ==
- Jeff Sullivan (disambiguation)
- Jeffrey Sullivan (disambiguation)
