= Jeff Sullivan =

Jeff Sullivan may refer to:

- Jeff Sullivan (politician) (1904–1962), former Lieutenant Governor for the Commonwealth of Massachusetts
- Jeff Sullivan (Futura) of Futura

== See also ==
- Jeffrey Sullivan (disambiguation)
- Geoff Sullivan (disambiguation)
