= Jeffrey Sullivan =

Jeffrey Sullivan may refer to:

- Jeffrey Sullivan (racehorse owner), see American Horse of the Year
- Jeffrey C. Sullivan, see Dismissal of U.S. attorneys controversy timeline
- Jeffrey Sullivan (ice hockey), played in 1997–98 Ottawa Senators season

== See also ==
- Jeff Sullivan (disambiguation)
- Geoff Sullivan (disambiguation)
