= Western Port Province =

Former electoral province of the Victorian Legislative Council, Australia

Western Port Province Victoria—Legislative Council
- State: Victoria
- Created: 2002
- Abolished: 2006
- Namesake: Western Port

Western Port Province was an electorate of the Victorian Legislative Council. It was created in 2002 as a replacement for the abolished South Eastern Province. It was intended to be a two-member electorate, but it was abolished in 2006 as part of the Bracks Labor government's reform of the Legislative Council, before the second member was due to be elected. The electorate would have normally been expected to be reasonably safe for the Liberal Party, but it was narrowly won by the Labor Party in their landslide victory at the 2002 state election.

It was located in the south-east of the state. In 2002, when it was last contested, it covered an area of 2,866 km^{2} and included the towns of Cowes, Hastings, Inverloch, Mornington, Mount Eliza, Pakenham, Rosebud, Rye, Sorrento and Wonthaggi.

== Members for Western Port Province ==
Year	Member	Party
2002	Geoff Hilton	Labor Party

== Election results ==
2002 Victorian state election: Western Port Province
Party	Candidate	Votes	%	±%
Liberal	Cameron Boardman	61,364	47.0	−7.1
Labor	Geoff Hilton	53,781	41.2	+4.8
Greens	Ian Hutchison	15,334	11.8	+7.9
Total formal votes		130,479	97.0	−0.3
Informal votes		3,997	3.0	+0.3
Turnout		134,476	93.6	
Two-party-preferred result
Labor	Geoff Hilton	65,441	50.2	+8.5
Liberal	Cameron Boardman	65,030	49.8	−8.5
Labor notional gain from Liberal		Swing	+8.5	
