= Jordan Crugnale =

Australian politician

Jordan Crugnale MP

Member of the Victorian Legislative Assembly for Bass
- Incumbent
- Assumed office 24 November 2018
- Preceded by: Brian Paynter

Personal details
- Born: Albany, Western Australia
- Party: Australian Labor Party

Jordan Alessandra Crugnale (born 1969) is an Australian politician. She has been an Australian Labor Party member of the Victorian Legislative Assembly since November 2018, representing the seat of Bass.

Crugnale grew up in Albany, Western Australia, the child of migrant Italian parents. She trained as a teacher of English as a second language and has since worked in the education, mental health, aid and arts sectors. Her work has ranged from on the ground community led initiatives in regional Australia and overseas, through to high level strategic and advocacy projects.

Before her election to state parliament she had been a councillor at the Bass Coast Shire, serving as mayor in 2015–2016.

On 2 October 2025, Crugnale announced that she would not recontest her seat at the 2026 Victorian state election.

Parliament of Victoria
Preceded by Brian Paynter	Member for Bass; 2018–present	Incumbent
