= Geoff Hilton =

Australian politician

John Geoffrey Hilton (born 13 October 1947) is an Australian politician. He was a Labor Party member of the Victorian Legislative Council from 2002 to 2006, representing Western Port Province.

Hilton was born in St. Helens in the United Kingdom, and studied at the University of Aberdeen and Hull University. He was employed as an accountant after graduating, but moved into consultancy in the late 1970s, first as a management consultant, and then moving to executive recruitment.

In 2002, Hilton won Labor preselection to contest the new seat of Western Port Province. The seat had replaced the generally safe Liberal seat of South Eastern Province, and been made safer for the Liberal Party in the ensuing redistribution. Amidst the landslide Labor victory at the 2002 state election, Hilton defeated strong favourite and incumbent South Eastern Province Liberal MLC Cameron Boardman on preferences.

During his term in parliament, the Labor government passed sweeping electoral reforms of the Legislative Council which, amongst other changes, reduced the number of members. Hilton was one of the members unable to secure Labor preselection for a seat in the reformed chamber, and he subsequently chose to retire at the conclusion of his term.

He is a supporter of Melbourne rugby league team the Melbourne Storm.
