= Brian Paynter =

Australian politician (born 1965)

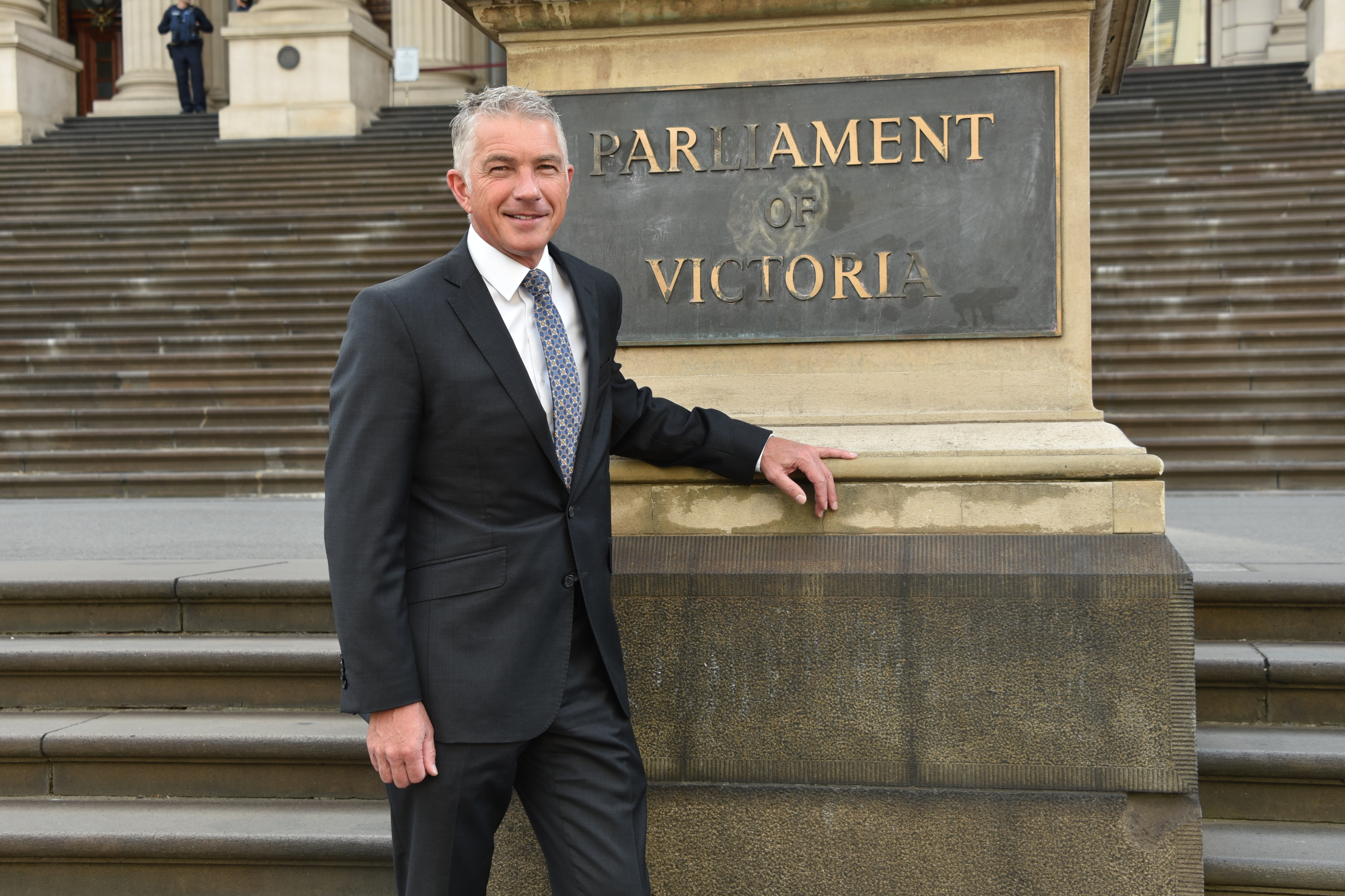
- Paynter outside the Parliament of Victoria

Member of the Victorian Legislative Assembly for Bass
- In office 29 November 2014 – 24 November 2018
- Preceded by: Ken Smith
- Succeeded by: Jordan Crugnale

Personal details
- Born: 2 May 1965 (age 60) Pakenham, Victoria, Australia
- Party: Liberal Party
- Occupation: Accountant

Brian Francis Paynter (born 2 May 1965) is an Australian politician. He was a Liberal Party member of the Victorian Legislative Assembly from 2014 to 2018, representing the seat of Bass.

Victorian Legislative Assembly
Preceded by Ken Smith	Member for Bass; 2014–2018	Succeeded by Jordan Crugnale
