= Gerard FitzGerald =

Australian rules footballer and coach

Personal information
- Full name: Gerard FitzGerald
- Born: 25 July 1957 (age 69)
- Original team: Derrinallum
- Height: 188 cm (6 ft 2 in)
- Weight: 84 kg (185 lb)

Playing career^{1}
Years	Club	Games (Goals)
1977	Geelong	3 (4)

Coaching career
Years	Club	Games (W–L–D)
1997–2002	North Ballarat (VFL)	
2003	Springvale	
2004	Port Melbourne	
2005–2006	North Ballarat Rebels	
2007–2015	North Ballarat (VFL)	
2016–	North Ballarat Rebels	
- ^{1} Playing statistics correct to the end of 1977.

Gerard FitzGerald (born 25 July 1957) is a former Australian rules footballer who played for Geelong in the Victorian Football League (VFL). He is most notable as the coach of the North Ballarat Football Club in the Victorian Football League, where he won three premierships and is the league's all-time longest serving coach.

FitzGerald made just three appearances in the Geelong seniors, all in the 1977 VFL season. In his second game he kicked three goals at Princes Park, against a strong Hawthorn team which amassed 191 points.

Between 1980 and 1996, FitzGerald spent more than ten years as the senior coach of country Victorian football teams in Sea Lake, Mortlake and Camperdown. For a time, he was the coach of the Victorian Country Football League representative team. He took over from Alan Ezard as coach of North Ballarat in the VFL in 1997 and remained with the club until the end of the 2002 season, leading the club to consecutive Grand Final defeats in 1999 and 2000. In 2002, he unsuccessfully contested the state seat of Ballarat East for the Liberal Party. He coached Springvale in 2003, then Port Melbourne in 2004, taking the club to the Grand Final. He returned to Ballarat in 2005, and was in charge of the North Ballarat Rebels in the TAC Cup in 2005 and 2006, before returning to the North Ballarat VFL club again in 2007. FitzGerald steered North Ballarat to its inaugural VFL premiership in 2008, and then to further premierships in 2009 and 2010. He coached at the club until the end of 2015, completing fifteen seasons with the Roosters; his contract was not renewed for the 2016 season. He will return to coaching the Rebels from the 2016 season.

FitzGerald holds the record for coaching the most senior games in VFA/VFL history, finishing with 345 games following the end of the 2015 season. FitzGerald surpassed previous record-holder Bill Faul (313 games) in Round 7, 2014.
