= Kay Nesbit =

Australia victim's rights advocate and public speaker

Kay Nesbit is a victim's rights advocate and public speaker in Australia. Nesbit suffered a shotgun wound that eventually led to 57 operations to reconstruct her face. She later became a victim's rights advocate, public speaker and ran for office in Victoria.

== Biography ==
Nesbit grew up on a farm in New Zealand near Christchurch. In 1977, she moved to Melbourne.

Nesbit's flatmate had been trying to avoid her boyfriend. Nesbit was shot on 11 September 1985 after she told Paul Terrance Mallinder via note that her flatmate didn't want to see him anymore. Nesbit survived the gunshot, but lost her jaw, part of her nose and her right eye. To help her out, more than $205,000 was raised on her behalf in 1986. The medical team at Alfred Hospital who reconstructed her face used other parts of her body to repair her damaged face. By 1993, she had completed 31 surgeries at Alfred Hospital. Eventually, she would have a total of 57 operations.

She has become an advocate for victims' rights. Nesbit began to start public speaking and telling her story in 1999. She stood in the 2002 Victorian state election as an independent but was not elected.

Nesbit's attacker, Mallinder, was found not guilty of "wounding with intent to cause murder" but guilty of "wounding with intent to cause grievous bodily harm" and sentenced to the maximum permissible 15 years in prison, which was reduced on appeal to 13 years with an 11-year non-parole period. He was released from prison after serving seven years.
