= Tammy Lobato =

Australian politician

Member of the Victorian Legislative Assembly for Gembrook
- In office 30 November 2002 – 26 November 2010
- Preceded by: District created
- Succeeded by: Brad Battin

Personal details
- Born: Tamara Louise Lobato; 27 June 1971 (age 55)
- Party: Labor
- Education: Victoria University

Tamara Louise Lobato (born 27 June 1971) is an Australian politician for the Labor Party in the state of Victoria. She was a member of the Victorian Legislative Assembly, representing the electoral district of Gembrook.

Lobato grew up in Tecoma, Victoria, and attended Tecoma Primary School, followed by Upwey High School. She studied for her diploma of Community Development at the Chisholm Institute in Melbourne, and attained a Bachelor of Arts (Community Development) at Victoria University. Before entering politics, Lobato worked as a bookkeeper, an office administrator, and in the retail trade. She has two children, and lives in the Melbourne suburb of Berwick.

Lobato was elected as the member for Gembrook at the 2002 Victorian state election. She was re-elected in 2006, winning by just 499 votes, but lost her seat in 2010. Lobato voted against abortion law reform in 2008. She was not targeted by right to life organisations, and her support for anti-abortion positions in parliament was unlikely to have been a factor in her defeat.

Lobato was a vocal campaigner against the introduction of genetically modified crops. She questioned whether the Victorian Chief Scientist, Sir Gustav Nossal, was independent enough to advise the Government of Victoria on the subject, and has been critical of Victorian Premier John Brumby for approving genetically modified canola plantations in Victoria. Said Lobato:

"I feel that Victoria will be put into a very risky situation. I believe that our agricultural industry will be put at risk. I know for a fact that people do not want to eat genetically modified foods."

Victorian Legislative Assembly
District created	Member for Gembrook; 2002–2010	Succeeded by Brad Battin
