= Ken Smith (Australian politician) =

Australian politician

The Honourable Ken Smith AM
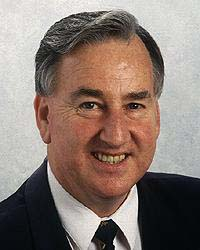

Speaker of the Victorian Legislative Assembly
- In office 21 December 2010 – 4 February 2014
- Deputy: Christine Fyffe
- Preceded by: Jenny Lindell
- Succeeded by: Christine Fyffe

Member of the Victorian Legislative Assembly for Bass
- In office 30 November 2002 – 29 November 2014
- Preceded by: Seat created
- Succeeded by: Brian Paynter

Personal details
- Born: Kenneth Maurice Smith; 30 December 1944 (age 81) Ormond, Victoria, Australia
- Party: Liberal Party
- Children: 3
- Occupation: Plumber

Kenneth Maurice Smith AM (born 30 December 1944) is an Australian politician who was the member for Bass in the Victorian Legislative Assembly from 2002 to 2014. He was Speaker of the Victorian Legislative Assembly from 21 December 2010 to 4 February 2014.

Smith was a plumber before he entered the Parliament of Victoria in 1988, winning the Legislative Council seat of South-Eastern Province for the Liberal Party. During his time in the Legislative Council, Smith served on the backbench, although after being returned at the 1996 election he served as government Whip. When the Kennett government lost power in 1999, Smith continued on as Opposition whip.

The redistribution prior to the 2002 election abolished his upper house province, and Smith decided to contest the new Lower House seat of Bass—basically a reconfigured Gippsland West. He faced Susan Davies, the independent MP for Gippsland West. While the election was a disaster for the Liberals, Smith provided them with their only gain, winning the seat after Davies was overtaken by Labor on the primary vote. Had Davies finished second on the first count, she would have likely picked up enough Labor preferences to retain this ancestrally Liberal seat.

Smith served as Shadow Minister for Gaming and Shadow Minister for Fisheries.

In 2008 Smith put forward a private member's bill that would allow euthanasia in Victoria. The bill was similar to the Dying With Dignity Act in Oregon in the United States, and generated considerable controversy. The bill was defeated in the Victorian Legislative Council.

In 2009, Smith was unopposed for preselection for the seat of Bass and was re-endorsed by the Liberal Party as their candidate

On 21 December 2010, Smith was elected unopposed as Speaker of the Legislative Assembly for the 57th Victorian Parliament. On 19 September 2013, he was forced to use his tiebreaking vote to carry a motion to suspend Opposition Leader Daniel Andrews for disorderly conduct. This ensued when Andrews accused Smith of bias when Smith ordered the removal of posters showing Liberal-turned-independent Geoff Shaw—whose vote was keeping the Coalition in office as a minority government—alongside government ministers, but ruled Premier Denis Napthine's claims of incompetence on the part of the previous Labor government were in order. Andrews refused Smith's order to leave the chamber for an hour and a half, prompting Smith to have the Serjeant-At-Arms remove him. Smith then "named" Andrews for disorderly conduct. With Shaw out of the chamber at the time, the vote on suspending Andrews was deadlocked at 40-40, forcing Smith to vote in favour of the motion and resulting in a Labor members walkout of Parliament.

In late 2013, Shaw declared that he had no confidence in Smith's speakership, after the Speaker had referred allegations regarding Shaw's use of parliamentary entitlements to the Victorian Ombudsman. From this time, 44 members (43 of them from the Labor opposition) lacked confidence in Mr Smith continuing as Speaker, with 43 members as well as Mr Smith himself maintaining confidence.

On 4 February 2014, Smith stood down as Speaker but announced he would remain an MP until the state election due in November, when he would retire.

Victorian Legislative Council
| Preceded by Hector Ward | Member for South-Eastern Province; 1988–2002 | Seat abolished |
Victorian Legislative Assembly
| District created | Member for Bass; 2002–2014 | Succeeded by Brian Paynter |
| Preceded by Jenny Lindell | Speaker of the Victorian Legislative Assembly; 2010–2014 | Succeeded by Christine Fyffe |
