= Electoral district of Gembrook =

State electoral district of Victoria, Australia

Gembrook Victoria—Legislative Assembly
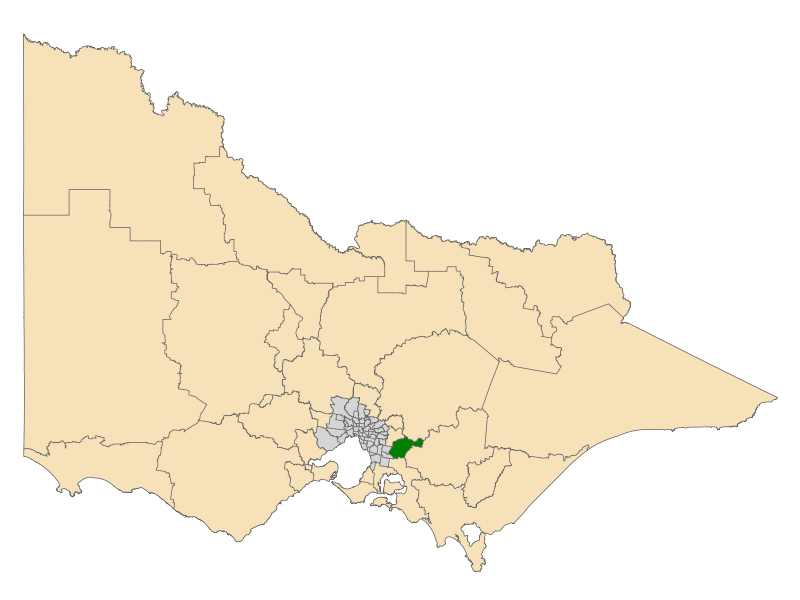
- Location of Gembrook (dark green) in Victoria
- State: Victoria
- Created: 2002
- Abolished: 2022
- Electors: 51,069 (2018)
- Area: 452 km^{2} (174.5 sq mi)
- Demographic: Mixed rural and urban fringe

The electoral district of Gembrook was an electoral district of the Victorian Legislative Assembly. It was situated on the edge of metropolitan Melbourne. Included within its boundaries were Emerald, Cockatoo, Gembrook, Beaconsfield, and sizeable parts of Berwick and Pakenham. The district formerly extended north to Yarra Valley communities such as Warburton and Launching Place prior to the seat's redistribution at the 2014 election.

The electorate was created in 2002, replacing the abolished electorates of Pakenham (which had its namesake moved into Bass) and Berwick. It was widely considered to be a safe Liberal seat, and was to be contested by Shadow Treasurer Robert Dean, formerly the member for Berwick. However, in a heavily publicised gaffe, it was discovered during the campaign that Dean was ineligible to stand as a candidate because he had not updated his enrolment after moving to his new electorate, and was therefore no longer a registered voter. He was quickly replaced with Neil Lucas, the MLC for the corresponding upper house seat of Eumemmerring Province. In an upset result widely attributed to the Dean affair, Lucas was defeated by Labor candidate Tammy Lobato. Lobato was narrowly re-elected at the 2006 election, but was defeated at the 2010 election by Brad Battin.

The seat was abolished by the Electoral Boundaries Commission ahead of the 2022 election and split into the electoral districts of Berwick, Pakenham and Monbulk.

== Members for Gembrook ==
Member	Party	Term
Tammy Lobato	Labor	2002–2010
Brad Battin	Liberal	2010–2022

== Election results ==
2018 Victorian state election: Gembrook
Party	Candidate	Votes	%	±%
Liberal	Brad Battin	21,202	48.26	−6.42
Labor	Michael Galea	18,065	41.12	+10.48
Greens	Amy Gregorovich	4,667	10.62	+2.16
Total formal votes		43,934	94.46	−0.25
Informal votes		2,575	5.54	+0.25
Turnout		46,509	91.07	−3.31
Two-party-preferred result
Liberal	Brad Battin	22,313	50.79	−8.16
Labor	Michael Galea	21,621	49.21	+8.16
Liberal hold		Swing	−8.16	
