= 2002 Victorian state election =

Australian state election

← 1999	30 November 2002	2006 →

All 88 seats in the Victorian Legislative Assembly and 22 (of the 44) seats in the Victorian Legislative Council 45 seats needed for a majority
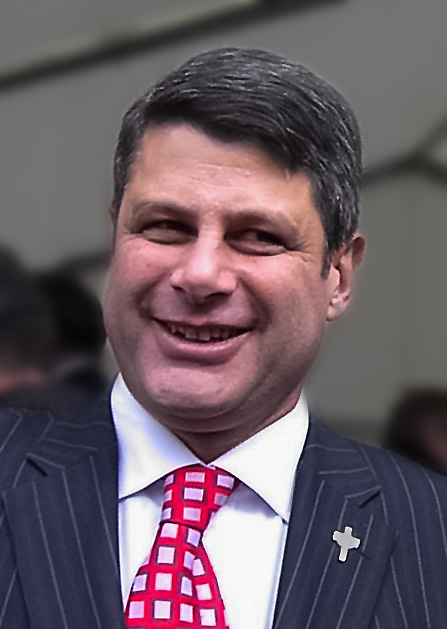

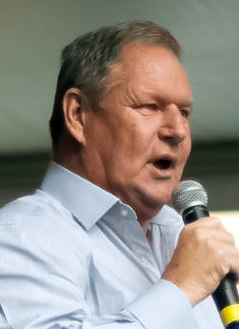

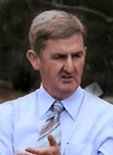
	First party	Second party	Third party
Leader	Steve Bracks	Robert Doyle	Peter Ryan
Party	Labor	Liberal	National
Leader since	22 March 1999	20 August 2002	16 December 1999
Leader's seat	Williamstown	Malvern	Gippsland South
Last election	42 seats	36 seats	7 seats
Seats won	62	17	7
Seat change	▲20	▼19	Steady
Popular vote	1,392,704	985,011	125,003
Percentage	47.95%	33.91%	4.30%
Swing	▲2.38	▼8.31	▼0.50
TPP	57.78%	42.22%
TPP swing	▲7.58	▼7.58
- Results in each electorate.
Premier before election
Steve Bracks
Labor
Elected Premier
Steve Bracks
Labor

The 2002 Victorian state election, held on Saturday, 30 November 2002, was for the 55th Parliament of Victoria. It was held to elect the 88 members of Victorian Legislative Assembly and 22 members of the 44-member Legislative Council.

The Labor government led by Premier Steve Bracks was returned for a second term in a landslide victory, taking 62 seats, a gain of 20. It was easily the biggest majority that Labor had ever won in Victoria, and one of Labor's best-ever performances at the state level in Australia. Additionally, it was only the third time that a Labor government had been reelected in Victoria. Labor also recorded 57.8 percent of the two-party preferred vote, their highest on record for a Victorian election. Labor also won a majority of seats in the Legislative Council for the first time in its history.

Jeff Kennett had resigned as Liberal leader soon after his shock defeat in 1999, and was succeeded by former Health Minister Denis Napthine. However, Napthine was unable to get the better of Bracks, and was ousted in August 2002 by Shadow Health Minister Robert Doyle. With just a few months before the writs were dropped, Doyle was unable to recover any significant ground. The Liberals saw their seat tally more than halved, to 17 seats — their worst result since the 1952 election.

The Nationals (who after breaking off their Coalition with the Liberals rebranded themselves the 'VicNats') retained the seven seats they held from 1999.

Labor was assisted by a strong economy and by the popularity of Steve Bracks, while the Liberal Party was badly divided between the Kroger and Kennett factions. The Liberal campaign was also damaged by the revelation that the shadow treasurer, Robert Dean, was ineligible to run. Dean's electorate of Berwick had been abolished and merged into the new electorate of Gembrook. Dean won Liberal preselection for Gembrook, but failed to update his address after moving to his new electorate. As a result, he was no longer on the electoral roll; Victorian law requires candidates to be registered voters. Treasurer John Brumby loudly wondered if the Liberals could be trusted to manage Victoria's economy if their shadow treasurer could not manage his own affairs.

This was the last Victorian election where the Legislative Council was elected using preferential voting in single-member districts (while each province has two members, they were elected at alternate elections). The Constitution (Parliamentary Reform) Act 2003 abolished the electoral provinces and divided Victoria into eight regions each electing five members using proportional representation, with all seats being vacated each election.

Future Premier Daniel Andrews entered parliament at this election.

== Results ==
=== Legislative Assembly ===
Party	Votes	%	+/–	Seats	+/–
Labor	1,392,704	47.95	▲2.38	62	▲20
Liberal	985,011	33.91	▼8.31	17	▼19
Greens	282,585	9.73	▲8.58	0	Steady
National	125,003	4.30	▼0.50	7	Steady
Independents	98,700	3.40	▼1.32	2	▼1
Citizens Electoral Council	9,654	0.33	▲0.33	0	Steady
Democrats	3,948	0.14	▼0.14	0	Steady
Socialist Alliance	3,274	0.11	▲0.04	0	Steady
Christian Democrats	1,723	0.06	▲0.04	0	Steady
Democratic Labour	1,035	0.04	▼0.18	0	Steady
Hope	914	0.03	▼0.36	0	Steady
Total	2,904,551	100.00	–	88	–
Valid votes	2,904,551	96.58			
Invalid/blank votes	102,791	3.42	▲0.84		
Total votes	3,007,342	100.00	–		
Registered voters/turnout	3,228,466	93.15	▼1.05		
Two-party-preferred
Labor	1,677,856	57.78	▲7.58		
Liberal/National Coalition	1,226,214	42.22	▼7.58		
Total	2,904,070	100.00	–		

=== Legislative Council ===
Results for the Legislative Council.

The following voting statistics exclude the two mid-term by-elections held on the same day, at which one seat each was retained by the Liberal and National parties.

Victorian state election, 30 November 2002 Legislative Council << 1999–2006 >>
Enrolled voters	3,228,466				
Votes cast	3,006,200		Turnout	93.12	+0.17
Informal votes	110,422		Informal	3.67	+0.30
Summary of votes by party
Party	Primary votes	%	Swing	Seats won	Seats held
Labor	1,375,245	47.49	▲+5.26	17	25
Liberal	999,392	34.51	▼–5.19	3	14
Greens	314,697	10.87	▲+8.64	0	0
National	126,419	4.37	▼–2.91	2	5
Democrats	51,718	1.79	▼–5.00	0	0
Hope	4,615	0.16	New	0	0
Christian Democrats	4,615	0.14	▼–0.10	0	0
Independent	19,534	0.67	▼–0.62	0	0
Total	2,895,778			22	44
Two-party-preferred
Labor	1,675,893	57.85	▲+7.74		
Liberal/National	1,220,999	42.15	▼–7.74		

=== Electoral maps ===
Metropolitan Melbourne: ALP held seats are marked in red. Liberal seats are coloured blue.

Country Victoria: ALP seats are coloured in red, Liberal in blue, Nationals in green and independents in yellow.

== Seats changing hands ==
Seat	Pre-2002			Swing	Post-2002		
Seat	Party	Member	Margin	Swing	Margin	Member	Party
Bass	Independent	Susan Davies	3.6	-4.2	0.6	Ken Smith	Liberal
Bayswater	Liberal	Gordon Ashley	6.3	-9.0	2.7	Peter Lockwood	Labor
Bellarine	Liberal	Garry Spry	1.1	-9.3	8.2	Lisa Neville	Labor
Benalla*	Labor	Denise Allen	0.4	-2.4	2.0	Bill Sykes	National
Bentleigh	Liberal	Inga Peulich	1.9	-6.6	4.7	Rob Hudson	Labor
Cranbourne	Liberal	Gary Rowe	-1.1	-9.7	10.8	Jude Perera	Labor
Eltham	Liberal	Wayne Phillips	3.7	-8.5	4.8	Steve Herbert	Labor
Evelyn	Liberal	Christine Fyffe	12.3	-12.6	0.3	Heather McTaggart	Labor
Ferntree Gully	Liberal	Hurtle Lupton	7.6	-9.9	2.3	Anne Eckstein	Labor
Forest Hill	Liberal	John Richardson	6.2	-12.0	5.8	Kirstie Marshall	Labor
Frankston	Liberal	Andrea McCall	3.2	-9.0	5.8	Alistair Harkness	Labor
Gembrook	Liberal	notional - new seat	6.7	-8.3	1.6	Tammy Lobato	Labor
Hastings	Liberal	notional - new seat	7.1	-8.0	0.9	Rosy Buchanan	Labor
Kilsyth	Liberal	Lorraine Elliott	7.9	-10.0	2.1	Dympna Beard	Labor
Monbulk	Liberal	Steve McArthur	2.4	-10.7	8.3	James Merlino	Labor
Mordialloc	Liberal	Geoff Leigh	2.5	-7.0	4.5	Janice Munt	Labor
Mount Waverley	Liberal	Ron Wilson	9.0	-11.3	2.3	Maxine Morand	Labor
Narre Warren North	Liberal	notional - new seat	5.1	-14.8	9.7	Luke Donnellan	Labor
Narre Warren South	Liberal	notional - new seat	1.3	-13.9	12.6	Dale Wilson	Labor
Prahran	Liberal	Leonie Burke	4.7	-9.1	4.4	Tony Lupton	Labor
South Barwon	Liberal	Alister Paterson	4.7	-9.7	5.0	Michael Crutchfield	Labor

- Results for Benalla are based from the 2000 by-election, which Labor won from the Nationals.
- Cranbourne became a notionally Labor seat after the redistribution.
- Members listed in italics did not recontest their seats.

== See also ==
- Members of the Victorian Legislative Assembly, 2002–2006
- Candidates of the 2002 Victorian state election
