= Hope Party Australia =

Australian political party (1997–2004)

The Hope Party Australia was a minor Australian political party active between 1997 and 2004. It was founded in 1997 in Melbourne by Tim Petherbridge and registered at both federal and state level in 1999. The party contested several elections but had little success. It was deregistered in 2006.
