= Results of the 2018 Victorian state election (Legislative Assembly) =

Australian state election results

Victorian state election, 24 November 2018 Legislative Assembly << 2014–2022 >>
Enrolled voters	4,139,326				
Votes cast	3,732,066		Turnout	90.16	−2.86
Informal votes	217,592		Informal	5.83	+0.61
Summary of votes by party
Party	Primary votes	%	Swing	Seats	Change
Labor	1,506,460	42.86	+4.77	55	+8
Liberal	1,069,287	30.43	−6.04	21	−9
Greens	376,470	10.71	−0.77	3	+1*
National	167,625	4.77	−0.76	6	−2
Animal Justice	63,970	1.82	+1.59	0	±0
Shooters, Fishers, Farmers	24,257	0.69	+0.61	0	±0
Democratic Labour	24,097	0.69	+0.60	0	±0
Victorian Socialists	15,442	0.44	+0.44	0	±0
Reason	12,695	0.36	+0.10	0	±0
Transport Matters	10,313	0.29	+0.29	0	±0
Justice	9,277	0.26	+0.26	0	±0
Sustainable Australia	8,183	0.23	+0.23	0	±0
Country	6,566	0.19	−1.10	0	±0
Liberal Democrats	4,030	0.12	+0.12	0	±0
Aussie Battler	1,281	0.04	+0.04	0	±0
Liberty Alliance	1,232	0.04	+0.04	0	±0
Independent	213,289	6.07	+3.47	3	+2**
Total	3,514,474			88	
Two-party-preferred
Labor	1,988,534	57.30	+5.31		
Liberal/National	1,481,975	42.70	−5.31		

This is a list of electoral district results for the 2018 Victorian state election for the Legislative Assembly.

== Results by electoral district ==
=== Albert Park ===
2018 Victorian state election: Albert Park
Party	Candidate	Votes	%	±%
Labor	Martin Foley	17,287	43.37	+11.04
Liberal	Andrew Bond	12,457	31.25	−10.24
Greens	Ogy Simic	6,601	16.56	−0.21
Animal Justice	Tamasin Ramsay	1,555	3.90	+3.90
Reason	Jarryd Bartle	1,079	2.71	−0.75
Sustainable Australia	Steven Armstrong	597	1.50	+1.50
Independent	Joseph Toscano	282	0.71	+0.71
Total formal votes		39,858	95.23	−0.64
Informal votes		1,997	4.77	+0.64
Turnout		41,855	85.51	−2.94
Two-party-preferred result
Labor	Martin Foley	25,161	63.13	+10.17
Liberal	Andrew Bond	14,697	36.87	−10.17
Labor hold		Swing	+10.17	

=== Altona ===
2018 Victorian state election: Altona
Party	Candidate	Votes	%	±%
Labor	Jill Hennessy	24,112	51.40	−0.54
Liberal	Christian Martinu	11,194	23.86	−7.58
Independent	Tony Hooper	5,861	12.50	+12.50
Greens	Emma-Jane Byrne	4,217	8.99	−1.04
Independent	Maria Aylward	1,522	3.24	+3.24
Total formal votes		46,906	94.56	+0.01
Informal votes		2,699	5.44	−0.01
Turnout		49,605	89.51	−3.13
Two-party-preferred result
Labor	Jill Hennessy	30,264	64.57	+2.01
Liberal	Christian Martinu	16,607	35.43	−2.01
Labor hold		Swing	+2.01	

=== Bass ===
2018 Victorian state election: Bass
Party	Candidate	Votes	%	±%
Liberal	Brian Paynter	20,315	40.97	−4.38
Labor	Jordan Crugnale	19,954	40.24	+10.88
Greens	David Arnault	2,821	5.69	−3.41
Independent	Clare Le Serve	2,212	4.46	−6.34
Shooters, Fishers, Farmers	Frank Ripa	2,011	4.06	+4.06
Democratic Labour	Ross McPhee	1,288	2.60	+2.60
Independent	Ron Bauer	603	1.22	+1.22
Independent	Kate Lempriere	385	0.78	+0.78
Total formal votes		49,589	93.37	−1.22
Informal votes		3,522	6.63	+1.22
Turnout		53,111	91.06	−3.30
Two-party-preferred result
Labor	Jordan Crugnale	25,982	52.39	+6.94
Liberal	Brian Paynter	23,607	47.61	−6.94
Labor gain from Liberal		Swing	+6.94	

=== Bayswater ===
2018 Victorian state election: Bayswater
Party	Candidate	Votes	%	±%
Liberal	Heidi Victoria	17,650	46.29	−3.00
Labor	Jackson Taylor	15,548	40.78	+6.90
Greens	Asher Cookson	3,228	8.47	−0.33
Animal Justice	Nathan Schram	1,700	4.46	+1.02
Total formal votes		38,126	94.70	−0.23
Informal votes		2,135	5.30	+0.23
Turnout		40,261	91.40	−2.70
Two-party-preferred result
Labor	Jackson Taylor	19,211	50.39	+5.01
Liberal	Heidi Victoria	18,915	49.61	−5.01
Labor gain from Liberal		Swing	+5.01	

=== Bellarine ===
2018 Victorian state election: Bellarine
Party	Candidate	Votes	%	±%
Labor	Lisa Neville	21,948	49.87	+6.31
Liberal	Brian McKiterick	15,619	35.49	−5.12
Greens	Rachel Semmens	3,957	8.99	−0.43
Animal Justice	Naomi Adams	1,968	4.47	+4.47
Victorian Socialists	Jackie Kriz	521	1.18	+1.18
Total formal votes		44,013	96.06	+0.90
Informal votes		1,804	3.94	−0.90
Turnout		45,817	92.72	−2.66
Two-party-preferred result
Labor	Lisa Neville	27,049	61.45	+6.61
Liberal	Brian McKiterick	16,966	38.55	−6.61
Labor hold		Swing	+6.61	

=== Benambra ===
2018 Victorian state election: Benambra
Party	Candidate	Votes	%	±%
Liberal	Bill Tilley	16,515	39.86	−14.75
Labor	Mark Tait	7,467	18.02	−13.25
Independent	Jacqui Hawkins	6,687	16.14	+16.14
Independent	Jenny O'Connor	5,427	13.10	+13.10
Shooters, Fishers, Farmers	Josh Knight	3,774	9.11	+9.11
Greens	John Bardsley	1,565	3.78	−5.31
Total formal votes		41,435	94.66	−0.80
Informal votes		2,336	5.34	+0.80
Turnout		43,771	89.70	−3.17
Two-party-preferred result
Liberal	Bill Tilley	24,393	58.91	−0.76
Labor	Mark Tait	17,013	41.09	+0.76
Two-candidate-preferred result
Liberal	Bill Tilley	21,732	52.45	−7.23
Independent	Jacqui Hawkins	19,703	47.55	+47.55
Liberal hold		Swing	N/A	

=== Bendigo East ===
2018 Victorian state election: Bendigo East
Party	Candidate	Votes	%	±%
Labor	Jacinta Allan	21,693	50.35	+4.07
Liberal	Ian Ellis	8,987	20.86	−20.06
National	Gaelle Broad	6,864	15.93	+15.93
Greens	Nakita Thomson	3,465	8.04	+0.76
Democratic Labour	Helen Leach	1,080	2.51	+2.51
Independent	Michael Belardinelli	999	2.32	+2.32
Total formal votes		43,088	95.62	−0.90
Informal votes		1,976	4.38	+0.90
Turnout		45,064	92.16	−2.79
Two-party-preferred result
Labor	Jacinta Allan	26,776	62.11	+7.12
Liberal	Ian Ellis	16,332	37.89	−7.12
Labor hold		Swing	+7.12	

=== Bendigo West ===
2018 Victorian state election: Bendigo West
Party	Candidate	Votes	%	±%
Labor	Maree Edwards	21,004	53.48	+5.62
Liberal	Kevin Finn	10,641	27.09	−5.24
Greens	Laurie Whelan	5,127	13.05	+1.30
Animal Justice	Marilyn Nuske	2,504	6.38	+6.38
Total formal votes		39,276	95.06	−0.55
Informal votes		2,042	4.94	+0.55
Turnout		41,318	91.16	−2.67
Two-party-preferred result
Labor	Maree Edwards	26,917	68.55	+6.37
Liberal	Kevin Finn	12,349	31.45	−6.37
Labor hold		Swing	+6.37	

=== Bentleigh ===
2018 Victorian state election: Bentleigh
Party	Candidate	Votes	%	±%
Labor	Nick Staikos	18,443	50.20	+11.60
Liberal	Asher Judah	12,232	33.29	−12.59
Greens	Sarah Dekiere	2,763	7.52	−3.05
Independent	Oscar Lobo	752	2.05	+2.05
Animal Justice	Naren Chellappah	709	1.93	+1.93
Justice	Ellie Jean Sullivan	572	1.56	+1.56
Reason	Dave Stott	452	1.23	−0.66
Democratic Labour	Fi Fraser	412	1.12	+1.12
Sustainable Australia	Hans Verzijl	312	0.85	+0.85
Independent	George Mavroyeni	92	0.25	+0.25
Total formal votes		36,739	93.85	−0.91
Informal votes		2,408	6.15	+0.91
Turnout		39,147	91.52	−2.03
Two-party-preferred result
Labor	Nick Staikos	22,811	61.92	+11.27
Liberal	Asher Judah	14,031	38.08	−11.27
Labor hold		Swing	+11.27	

=== Box Hill ===
2018 Victorian state election: Box Hill
Party	Candidate	Votes	%	±%
Liberal	Robert Clark	17,352	45.25	−5.89
Labor	Paul Hamer	15,360	40.05	+9.38
Greens	Sophia Sun	5,639	14.70	+0.22
Total formal votes		38,351	95.40	−0.85
Informal votes		1,850	4.60	+0.85
Turnout		40,201	91.40	−2.00
Two-party-preferred result
Labor	Paul Hamer	19,982	52.10	+7.80
Liberal	Robert Clark	18,369	47.90	−7.80
Labor gain from Liberal		Swing	+7.80	

=== Brighton ===
2018 Victorian state election: Brighton
Party	Candidate	Votes	%	±%
Liberal	James Newbury	17,597	45.40	−10.12
Labor	Declan Martin	12,193	31.46	+7.90
Greens	Katherine Copsey	5,854	15.10	−2.28
Animal Justice	Cathy Taylor	1,961	5.06	+5.06
Sustainable Australia	Alison Pridham	881	2.27	+2.27
Independent	John Tiger Casley	273	0.70	+0.70
Total formal votes		38,759	95.81	−0.59
Informal votes		1,697	4.19	+0.59
Turnout		40,456	89.46	−2.59
Two-party-preferred result
Liberal	James Newbury	19,812	51.12	−8.66
Labor	Declan Martin	18,947	48.88	+8.66
Liberal hold		Swing	−8.66	

=== Broadmeadows ===
2018 Victorian state election: Broadmeadows
Party	Candidate	Votes	%	±%
Labor	Frank McGuire	22,047	68.28	+4.12
Liberal	Jenny Dow	5,321	16.48	−0.75
Greens	Sheriden Tate	2,612	8.09	+2.49
Victorian Socialists	Jerome Small	2,307	7.15	+7.15
Total formal votes		32,287	89.90	−1.58
Informal votes		3,629	10.10	+1.58
Turnout		35,916	82.27	−5.87
Two-party-preferred result
Labor	Frank McGuire	25,957	80.28	+2.45
Liberal	Jenny Dow	6,375	19.72	−2.45
Labor hold		Swing	+2.45	

=== Brunswick ===
2018 Victorian state election: Brunswick
Party	Candidate	Votes	%	±%
Greens	Tim Read	17,599	40.06	+0.42
Labor	Cindy O'Connor	16,701	38.02	+0.06
Liberal	Adam Wojtonis	4,450	10.13	−6.11
Reason	Catherine Deveny	1,969	4.48	+4.48
Independent	George Georgiou	1,240	2.82	+2.82
Animal Justice	Christopher Miles	829	1.89	+0.12
Liberal Democrats	Noel Collins	613	1.40	+1.40
Independent	Kerry Sourasis	276	0.63	+0.63
Independent	Christopher Anderson	250	0.57	+0.57
Total formal votes		43,927	93.75	−1.33
Informal votes		2,927	6.25	+1.33
Turnout		46,854	87.84	−2.56
Two-party-preferred result
Labor	Cindy O'Connor	37,066	84.38	+4.98
Liberal	Adam Wojtonis	6,861	15.62	−4.98
Two-candidate-preferred result
Greens	Tim Read	22,215	50.57	+2.53
Labor	Cindy O'Connor	21,712	49.43	−2.53
Greens gain from Labor		Swing	+2.53	

=== Bulleen ===
2018 Victorian state election: Bulleen
Party	Candidate	Votes	%	±%
Liberal	Matthew Guy	19,441	52.18	−4.02
Labor	Fiona Mackenzie	13,597	36.50	+6.18
Greens	Chris Kearney	4,219	11.32	+1.55
Total formal votes		37,257	93.37	−1.73
Informal votes		2,646	6.63	+1.73
Turnout		39,903	90.46	−2.88
Two-party-preferred result
Liberal	Matthew Guy	20,826	55.77	−4.79
Labor	Fiona Mackenzie	16,518	44.23	+4.79
Liberal hold		Swing	−4.79	

=== Bundoora ===
2018 Victorian state election: Bundoora
Party	Candidate	Votes	%	±%
Labor	Colin Brooks	19,716	56.17	+3.52
Liberal	Jenny Mulholland	9,958	28.37	−5.04
Greens	Clement Stanyon	2,790	7.95	−2.20
Animal Justice	Rodney Whitfield	1,011	2.88	+2.88
Reason	Bryce Baker	818	2.33	+2.33
Victorian Socialists	Jacob Andrewartha	805	2.29	+2.29
Total formal votes		35,098	94.04	−1.43
Informal votes		2,226	5.96	+1.43
Turnout		37,324	91.27	−2.71
Two-party-preferred result
Labor	Colin Brooks	23,722	67.42	+5.20
Liberal	Jenny Mulholland	11,462	32.58	−5.20
Labor hold		Swing	+5.20	

=== Buninyong ===
2018 Victorian state election: Buninyong
Party	Candidate	Votes	%	±%
Labor	Michaela Settle	18,965	49.14	+5.59
Liberal	Andrew Kilmartin	11,921	30.89	−4.07
Greens	Linda Zibell	3,542	9.18	−1.77
Animal Justice	Wendy Morrison	1,581	4.10	+4.10
Independent	Dianne Colbert	1,285	3.33	+3.33
Independent	Brendan Eckel	467	1.21	+1.21
Independent	Lindsay Watters	436	1.13	+1.13
Victorian Socialists	Jane McKendrick	397	1.03	+1.03
Total formal votes		38,594	92.43	−2.76
Informal votes		3,160	7.57	+2.76
Turnout		41,754	91.65	−2.64
Two-party-preferred result
Labor	Michaela Settle	24,108	62.24	+5.88
Liberal	Andrew Kilmartin	14,627	37.76	−5.88
Labor hold		Swing	+5.88	

=== Burwood ===
2018 Victorian state election: Burwood
Party	Candidate	Votes	%	±%
Liberal	Graham Watt	16,138	42.73	−7.33
Labor	Will Fowles	14,924	39.52	+5.10
Greens	Graham Ross	4,604	12.19	−0.80
Sustainable Australia	Andrew Williams	1,101	2.92	+2.92
Animal Justice	Amanda Beattie	1,000	2.65	+2.65
Total formal votes		37,767	96.55	+0.02
Informal votes		1,348	3.45	−0.02
Turnout		39,115	90.61	−2.80
Two-party-preferred result
Labor	Will Fowles	20,132	53.31	+6.47
Liberal	Graham Watt	17,635	46.69	−6.47
Labor gain from Liberal		Swing	+6.47	

=== Carrum ===
2018 Victorian state election: Carrum
Party	Candidate	Votes	%	±%
Labor	Sonya Kilkenny	21,844	52.74	+10.52
Liberal	Donna Bauer	13,608	32.85	−12.30
Greens	Braeden Thompson	2,432	5.87	−1.71
Justice	Simone Philpott-Smart	1,822	4.40	+4.40
Democratic Labour	Jennifer Bowden	696	1.68	+1.68
Transport Matters	Santosh Kumar Yadav	585	1.41	+1.41
Independent	Michael Tellesson	433	1.05	+1.05
Total formal votes		41,420	94.06	−0.83
Informal votes		2,618	5.94	+0.83
Turnout		44,038	90.38	−2.83
Two-party-preferred result
Labor	Sonya Kilkenny	25,660	61.95	+11.23
Liberal	Donna Bauer	15,761	38.05	−11.23
Labor hold		Swing	+11.23	

=== Caulfield ===
2018 Victorian state election: Caulfield
Party	Candidate	Votes	%	±%
Liberal	David Southwick	17,861	46.85	−4.84
Labor	Sorina Grasso	13,054	34.24	+4.51
Greens	Dinesh Mathew	5,387	14.13	−2.15
Animal Justice	Troy Evans	1,153	3.02	+3.02
Sustainable Australia	Aviya Bavati	665	1.74	+1.74
Total formal votes		38,120	95.65	−0.18
Informal votes		1,735	4.35	+0.18
Turnout		39,855	88.13	−2.53
Two-party-preferred result
Liberal	David Southwick	19,162	50.27	−4.61
Labor	Sorina Grasso	18,958	49.73	+4.61
Liberal hold		Swing	−4.61	

=== Clarinda ===
2018 Victorian state election: Clarinda
Party	Candidate	Votes	%	±%
Labor	Meng Heang Tak	20,421	55.55	+2.28
Liberal	Gandhi Bevinakoppa	9,083	24.71	−4.43
Greens	Josh Fergeus	3,870	10.53	−0.76
Independent	Michael Gardner	1,829	4.98	+4.98
Transport Matters	Zhi Gang Zhuang	1,558	4.24	+4.24
Total formal votes		36,761	93.29	−0.57
Informal votes		2,644	6.71	+0.57
Turnout		39,405	88.63	−3.29
Two-party-preferred result
Labor	Meng Heang Tak	24,788	67.43	+1.58
Liberal	Gandhi Bevinakoppa	11,976	32.58	−1.58
Labor hold		Swing	+1.58	

=== Cranbourne ===
2018 Victorian state election: Cranbourne
Party	Candidate	Votes	%	±%
Labor	Pauline Richards	25,725	50.29	+6.91
Liberal	Ann-Marie Hermans	16,483	32.22	−9.08
Justice	Jason Soultanidis	2,288	4.47	+4.47
Greens	Jake Tilton	2,008	3.93	−0.24
Transport Matters	Tarlochan Singh	1,827	3.57	+3.57
Australia First	Susan Jakobi	1,265	2.47	+2.47
Democratic Labour	Edward Sok	933	1.82	+1.82
Independent	Norman Fosberry	465	0.91	+0.91
Independent	Ravi Ragupathy	164	0.32	+0.32
Total formal votes		51,158	92.37	−1.07
Informal votes		4,227	7.63	+1.07
Turnout		55,385	89.60	−3.82
Two-party-preferred result
Labor	Pauline Richards	31,291	60.98	+8.65
Liberal	Ann-Marie Hermans	20,021	39.02	−8.65
Labor hold		Swing	+8.65	

=== Croydon ===
2018 Victorian state election: Croydon
Party	Candidate	Votes	%	±%
Liberal	David Hodgett	18,108	47.97	−5.73
Labor	Josh Cusack	14,307	37.90	+7.11
Greens	Caleb O'Flynn	3,468	9.19	+0.31
Animal Justice	Vinita Costantino	1,863	4.94	+4.94
Total formal votes		37,746	95.03	−0.57
Informal votes		1,975	4.97	+0.57
Turnout		39,721	92.39	−2.29
Two-party-preferred result
Liberal	David Hodgett	19,671	52.11	−7.18
Labor	Josh Cusack	18,075	47.89	+7.18
Liberal hold		Swing	−7.18	

=== Dandenong ===
2018 Victorian state election: Dandenong
Party	Candidate	Votes	%	±%
Labor	Gabrielle Williams	21,823	66.00	+13.16
Liberal	Virosh Perera	7,608	23.01	−5.96
Greens	Rhonda Garad	2,483	7.51	−0.20
Transport Matters	Afroz Ahmed	1,150	3.48	+3.48
Total formal votes		33,064	90.98	−0.72
Informal votes		3,278	9.02	+0.72
Turnout		36,342	85.79	−3.83
Two-party-preferred result
Labor	Gabrielle Williams	24,476	73.93	+11.05
Liberal	Virosh Perera	8,632	26.07	−11.05
Labor hold		Swing	+11.05	

=== Eildon ===
2018 Victorian state election: Eildon
Party	Candidate	Votes	%	±%
Liberal	Cindy McLeish	18,717	48.35	+4.92
Labor	Sally Brennan	13,850	35.77	+7.74
Greens	Ken Deacon	4,035	10.42	−1.26
Independent	Michelle Dunscombe	2,113	5.46	+5.46
Total formal votes		38,715	94.67	−0.10
Informal votes		2,178	5.33	+0.10
Turnout		40,893	91.11	−3.03
Two-party-preferred result
Liberal	Cindy McLeish	20,296	52.44	−1.32
Labor	Sally Brennan	18,410	47.56	+1.32
Liberal hold		Swing	−1.32	

=== Eltham ===
2018 Victorian state election: Eltham
Party	Candidate	Votes	%	±%
Labor	Vicki Ward	19,831	49.22	+8.63
Liberal	Nick McGowan	15,639	38.81	−5.13
Greens	Matthew Goodman	4,208	10.44	−0.96
Democratic Labour	Peter O'Brien	614	1.52	+1.52
Total formal votes		40,292	96.16	+0.45
Informal votes		1,610	3.84	−0.45
Turnout		41,902	93.49	−1.42
Two-party-preferred result
Labor	Vicki Ward	23,802	59.07	+6.38
Liberal	Nick McGowan	16,490	40.93	−6.38
Labor hold		Swing	+6.38	

=== Essendon ===
2018 Victorian state election: Essendon
Party	Candidate	Votes	%	±%
Labor	Danny Pearson	19,173	46.23	+5.33
Liberal	Gino Potenza	11,414	27.52	−8.34
Greens	James Williams	6,971	16.81	−1.22
Independent	Richard Lawrence	1,702	4.10	+0.72
Independent	Kate Baker	1,356	3.27	+3.27
Democratic Labour	Dermot Connors	856	2.06	+2.06
Total formal votes		41,472	95.25	−0.81
Informal votes		2,067	4.75	+0.81
Turnout		43,539	89.91	−2.52
Two-party-preferred result
Labor	Danny Pearson	27,315	65.86	+7.20
Liberal	Gino Potenza	14,157	34.14	−7.20
Labor hold		Swing	+7.20	

=== Euroa ===
2018 Victorian state election: Euroa
Party	Candidate	Votes	%	±%
National	Steph Ryan	24,749	58.95	+23.62
Labor	Fionna Deppeler-Morton	12,003	28.59	+0.74
Independent	Don Firth	3,035	7.23	+7.23
Greens	Keppel Cassidy	2,198	5.24	+0.09
Total formal votes		41,985	94.58	−0.73
Informal votes		2,405	5.42	+0.73
Turnout		44,390	90.13	−3.76
Two-party-preferred result
National	Steph Ryan	27,544	65.44	+0.97
Labor	Fionna Deppeler-Morton	14,547	34.56	−0.97
National hold		Swing	+0.97	

=== Evelyn ===
2018 Victorian state election: Evelyn
Party	Candidate	Votes	%	±%
Liberal	Bridget Vallence	18,566	49.49	−4.04
Labor	Gail Ritchie	15,166	40.42	+8.21
Greens	Brodie Everist	3,786	10.09	+3.44
Total formal votes		37,518	94.20	−0.08
Informal votes		2,311	5.80	+0.08
Turnout		39,829	92.28	−2.70
Two-party-preferred result
Liberal	Bridget Vallence	19,753	52.65	−6.94
Labor	Gail Ritchie	17,765	47.35	+6.94
Liberal hold		Swing	−6.94	

=== Ferntree Gully ===
2018 Victorian state election: Ferntree Gully
Party	Candidate	Votes	%	±%
Liberal	Nick Wakeling	17,614	49.41	−4.49
Labor	Julie Buxton	14,618	41.01	+7.85
Greens	Steve Raymond	3,414	9.58	+0.49
Total formal votes		35,646	94.28	−1.02
Informal votes		2,162	5.72	+1.02
Turnout		37,808	91.90	−0.97
Two-party-preferred result
Liberal	Nick Wakeling	18,407	51.64	−6.10
Labor	Julie Buxton	17,239	48.36	+6.10
Liberal hold		Swing	−6.10	

=== Footscray ===
2018 Victorian state election: Footscray
Party	Candidate	Votes	%	±%
Labor	Katie Hall	23,877	57.12	+11.98
Liberal	Emete Joesika	7,753	18.55	−8.18
Greens	Angus McAlpine	6,996	16.74	−0.46
Animal Justice	Shan Sun	3,177	7.60	+7.60
Total formal votes		41,803	93.96	−0.17
Informal votes		2,686	6.04	+0.17
Turnout		44,489	86.22	−3.32
Two-party-preferred result
Labor	Katie Hall	32,642	78.11	+13.62
Liberal	Emete Joesika	9,147	21.89	−13.62
Labor hold		Swing	+13.62	

=== Forest Hill ===
2018 Victorian state election: Forest Hill
Party	Candidate	Votes	%	±%
Liberal	Neil Angus	16,970	48.61	−1.11
Labor	Manoj Kumar	14,164	40.57	+5.37
Greens	Naresh Bhalla	3,083	8.83	−0.08
Independent	Claude Bai	696	1.99	+1.99
Total formal votes		34,913	95.44	−0.29
Informal votes		1,670	4.57	+0.29
Turnout		36,583	91.85	−2.17
Two-party-preferred result
Liberal	Neil Angus	17,858	51.15	−3.67
Labor	Manoj Kumar	17,055	48.85	+3.67
Liberal hold		Swing	−3.67	

=== Frankston ===
2018 Victorian state election: Frankston
Party	Candidate	Votes	%	±%
Labor	Paul Edbrooke	16,844	45.85	+10.87
Liberal	Michael Lamb	12,005	32.68	−3.16
Greens	Colin Lane	2,781	7.57	−0.40
Justice	Lachlan O'Connell	1,564	4.26	+4.26
Democratic Labour	Michael Long	1,366	3.72	+3.72
Animal Justice	James Persson	1,142	3.11	+3.11
Independent	Henry Kelsall	790	2.15	+2.15
Transport Matters	Jyothi Rudra	242	0.66	+0.66
Total formal votes		36,734	93.86	+2.74
Informal votes		2,403	6.14	−2.74
Turnout		39,137	88.03	−3.96
Two-party-preferred result
Labor	Paul Edbrooke	21,972	59.74	+9.26
Liberal	Michael Lamb	14,805	40.26	−9.26
Labor hold		Swing	+9.26	

=== Geelong ===
2018 Victorian state election: Geelong
Party	Candidate	Votes	%	±%
Labor	Christine Couzens	16,680	40.37	−0.66
Independent	Darryn Lyons	10,194	24.67	+24.67
Liberal	Freya Fidge	8,327	20.15	−17.68
Greens	Lois Newman	3,922	9.49	−2.51
Animal Justice	Jacki Jacka	1,173	2.84	+2.84
Victorian Socialists	Sarah Hathway	464	1.12	−0.04
Independent	Gottfried Wolf	300	0.73	+0.73
Independent	Stephen Juhasz	256	0.62	+0.62
Total formal votes		41,316	95.49	+0.27
Informal votes		1,950	4.51	−0.27
Turnout		43,266	90.94	−2.95
Two-party-preferred result
Labor	Christine Couzens	24,847	60.14	+4.11
Liberal	Freya Fidge	16,469	39.86	−4.11
Two-candidate-preferred result
Labor	Christine Couzens	23,250	56.23	+0.20
Independent	Darryn Lyons	18,098	43.77	+43.77
Labor hold		Swing	N/A	

=== Gembrook ===
2018 Victorian state election: Gembrook
Party	Candidate	Votes	%	±%
Liberal	Brad Battin	21,202	48.26	−6.42
Labor	Michael Galea	18,065	41.12	+10.48
Greens	Amy Gregorovich	4,667	10.62	+2.16
Total formal votes		43,934	94.46	−0.25
Informal votes		2,575	5.54	+0.25
Turnout		46,509	91.07	−3.31
Two-party-preferred result
Liberal	Brad Battin	22,313	50.79	−8.16
Labor	Michael Galea	21,621	49.21	+8.16
Liberal hold		Swing	−8.16	

=== Gippsland East ===
2018 Victorian state election: Gippsland East
Party	Candidate	Votes	%	±%
National	Tim Bull	22,438	56.73	−3.63
Labor	Mark Reeves	8,589	21.72	+1.35
Liberal Democrats	Sonia Buckley	2,507	6.34	+6.34
Greens	Deb Foskey	2,455	6.21	−1.76
Independent	Matt Stephenson	1,509	3.82	+3.82
Independent	George Neophytou	1,210	3.06	+3.06
Independent	Benjamin Garrett	842	2.13	+2.13
Total formal votes		39,550	94.25	−0.12
Informal votes		2,411	5.75	+0.12
Turnout		41,961	90.56	−3.02
Two-party-preferred result
National	Tim Bull	26,819	67.59	−0.32
Labor	Mark Reeves	12,859	32.41	+0.32
National hold		Swing	−0.32	

=== Gippsland South ===
2018 Victorian state election: Gippsland South
Party	Candidate	Votes	%	±%
National	Danny O'Brien	22,813	61.91	+4.65
Labor	Denise Ryan	10,464	28.40	+6.52
Greens	Ian Onley	3,573	9.70	+0.08
Total formal votes		36,850	94.53	+0.04
Informal votes		2,131	5.47	−0.04
Turnout		38,981	91.58	−2.42
Two-party-preferred result
National	Danny O'Brien	24,110	65.33	−0.34
Labor	Denise Ryan	12,797	34.67	+0.34
National hold		Swing	−0.34	

=== Hastings ===
2018 Victorian state election: Hastings
Party	Candidate	Votes	%	±%
Liberal	Neale Burgess	20,361	46.31	−4.89
Labor	Simon Meyer	16,916	38.47	+6.99
Greens	Nathan Lesslie	3,811	8.67	+1.23
Animal Justice	Georgia Knight	2,880	6.55	+6.55
Total formal votes		43,968	94.23	+0.13
Informal votes		2,691	5.77	−0.13
Turnout		46,659	90.80	−3.03
Two-party-preferred result
Liberal	Neale Burgess	22,452	51.06	−6.59
Labor	Simon Meyer	21,516	48.94	+6.59
Liberal hold		Swing	−6.59	

=== Hawthorn ===
2018 Victorian state election: Hawthorn
Party	Candidate	Votes	%	±%
Liberal	John Pesutto	17,231	43.89	−10.60
Labor	John Kennedy	12,646	32.21	+8.04
Greens	Nicholas Bieber	7,167	18.26	−3.07
Sustainable Australia	Sophie Paterson	960	2.45	+2.45
Animal Justice	Catherine Wright	885	2.25	+2.25
Independent	Richard Grummet	367	0.93	+0.93
Total formal votes		39,256	96.41	+0.16
Informal votes		1,462	3.59	−0.16
Turnout		40,718	90.83	−2.12
Two-party-preferred result
Labor	John Kennedy	19,793	50.42	+9.01
Liberal	John Pesutto	19,463	49.58	−9.01
Labor gain from Liberal		Swing	+9.01	

=== Ivanhoe ===
2018 Victorian state election: Ivanhoe
Party	Candidate	Votes	%	±%
Labor	Anthony Carbines	18,800	46.45	+10.49
Liberal	Monica Clark	13,084	32.33	−7.70
Greens	Andrew Conley	5,962	14.73	−0.91
Independent	Craig Langdon	1,969	4.86	+0.02
Democratic Labour	Philip Jenkins	660	1.63	+1.63
Total formal votes		40,475	95.22	−0.19
Informal votes		2,030	4.78	+0.19
Turnout		42,505	90.87	−1.98
Two-party-preferred result
Labor	Anthony Carbines	25,244	62.37	+8.96
Liberal	Monica Clark	15,231	37.63	−8.96
Labor hold		Swing	+8.96	

=== Kew ===
2018 Victorian state election: Kew
Party	Candidate	Votes	%	±%
Liberal	Tim Smith	19,098	49.26	−7.93
Labor	Marg D'Arcy	11,960	30.85	+4.35
Greens	Alex Marks	5,961	15.38	−0.94
Animal Justice	Bronwyn Gardiner	915	2.36	+2.36
Sustainable Australia	Paul Scaturchio	835	2.15	+2.15
Total formal votes		38,769	95.91	+0.02
Informal votes		1,655	4.09	−0.02
Turnout		40,424	91.33	−2.35
Two-party-preferred result
Liberal	Tim Smith	21,231	54.78	−5.87
Labor	Marg D'Arcy	17,528	45.22	+5.87
Liberal hold		Swing	−5.87	

=== Keysborough ===
2018 Victorian state election: Keysborough
Party	Candidate	Votes	%	±%
Labor	Martin Pakula	20,800	54.61	+1.56
Liberal	Darrel Taylor	10,919	28.67	−3.17
Independent	Hung Vo	2,401	6.30	+0.91
Greens	Ken McAlpine	1,882	4.94	−0.79
Animal Justice	Helen Jeges	1,407	3.69	+3.69
Transport Matters	Usman Mohammed Afzal	680	1.79	+1.79
Total formal votes		38,089	93.26	−0.68
Informal votes		2,752	6.74	+0.68
Turnout		40,841	90.10	−3.07
Two-party-preferred result
Labor	Martin Pakula	24,725	64.85	+2.95
Liberal	Darrel Taylor	13,399	35.15	−2.95
Labor hold		Swing	+2.95	

=== Kororoit ===
2018 Victorian state election: Kororoit
Party	Candidate	Votes	%	±%
Labor	Marlene Kairouz	26,769	63.51	+3.21
Liberal	Golam Haque	8,584	20.37	−1.55
Greens	Rohan Waring	3,615	8.58	+1.21
Animal Justice	Katherine Divita	3,180	7.54	+7.54
Total formal votes		42,148	92.82	−0.49
Informal votes		3,262	7.18	+0.49
Turnout		45,410	88.76	−3.29
Two-party-preferred result
Labor	Marlene Kairouz	31,719	75.65	+5.67
Liberal	Golam Haque	10,212	24.35	−5.67
Labor hold		Swing	+5.67	

=== Lara ===
2018 Victorian state election: Lara
Party	Candidate	Votes	%	±%
Labor	John Eren	22,951	57.92	+1.99
Liberal	Melissa Di Pasquale	9,559	24.12	−4.78
Greens	Amber Forbes	2,966	7.49	−1.41
Animal Justice	Bronwen Baker	2,740	6.92	+6.92
Victorian Socialists	Dean Cardigan	1,408	3.55	+3.55
Total formal votes		39,624	94.14	−1.26
Informal votes		2,467	5.86	+1.26
Turnout		42,091	89.51	−4.02
Two-party-preferred result
Labor	John Eren	27,430	69.14	+2.03
Liberal	Melissa Di Pasquale	12,244	30.86	−2.03
Labor hold		Swing	+2.03	

=== Lowan ===
2018 Victorian state election: Lowan
Party	Candidate	Votes	%	±%
National	Emma Kealy	25,562	66.94	+12.84
Labor	Maurice Billi	7,681	20.11	+1.53
Independent	Barry Shea	2,470	6.47	+6.47
Greens	Richard Lane	2,040	5.34	−3.18
Victorian Socialists	Trevor Grenfell	434	1.14	+1.14
Total formal votes		38,187	95.02	−0.45
Informal votes		2,002	4.98	+0.45
Turnout		40,189	92.52	−2.48
Two-party-preferred result
National	Emma Kealy	28,067	73.48	+2.22
Labor	Maurice Billi	10,129	26.52	−2.22
National hold		Swing	+2.22	

=== Macedon ===
2018 Victorian state election: Macedon
Party	Candidate	Votes	%	±%
Labor	Mary-Anne Thomas	19,251	47.97	+9.30
Liberal	Amanda Millar	12,836	31.98	−11.16
Greens	Ralf Thesing	3,936	9.81	−5.58
Animal Justice	Ruth Parramore	1,584	3.95	+3.95
Democratic Labour	Tony O'Brien	1,296	3.23	+3.23
Independent	Rob Bakes	1,230	3.06	+3.06
Total formal votes		40,133	95.27	−1.06
Informal votes		1,992	4.73	+1.06
Turnout		42,125	92.60	−2.16
Two-party-preferred result
Labor	Mary-Anne Thomas	25,384	63.18	+9.40
Liberal	Amanda Millar	14,794	36.82	−9.40
Labor hold		Swing	+9.40	

=== Malvern ===
2018 Victorian state election: Malvern
Party	Candidate	Votes	%	±%
Liberal	Michael O'Brien	19,003	51.25	−11.38
Labor	Oliver Squires	11,141	30.05	+8.66
Greens	Polly Morgan	4,659	12.56	−3.42
Sustainable Australia	Michaela Moran	1,161	3.13	+3.13
Animal Justice	Candace Feild	1,116	3.01	+3.01
Total formal votes		37,080	96.06	+0.08
Informal votes		1,522	3.94	−0.08
Turnout		38,602	89.99	−2.54
Two-party-preferred result
Liberal	Michael O'Brien	20,814	56.10	−10.15
Labor	Oliver Squires	16,285	43.90	+10.15
Liberal hold		Swing	−10.15	

=== Melbourne ===
2018 Victorian state election: Melbourne
Party	Candidate	Votes	%	±%
Greens	Ellen Sandell	15,755	38.85	−2.59
Labor	Jennifer Kanis	14,568	35.92	+6.65
Liberal	Darin Schade	6,920	17.06	−7.03
Reason	Leo Close	1,513	3.73	+3.73
Animal Justice	Lawrence Pope	830	2.05	−0.12
Liberal Democrats	Benjamin Rookes	410	1.01	+1.01
Independent	Peter Hanlon	328	0.81	+0.81
Aussie Battler	Kim Fuhrmann	233	0.57	+0.57
Total formal votes		40,557	95.29	−1.21
Informal votes		2,004	4.71	+1.21
Turnout		42,561	84.46	−3.08
Two-party-preferred result
Labor	Jennifer Kanis	30,521	75.25	+4.79
Liberal	Darin Schade	10,036	24.75	−4.79
Two-candidate-preferred result
Greens	Ellen Sandell	20,816	51.33	−1.04
Labor	Jennifer Kanis	19,741	48.68	+1.04
Greens hold		Swing	−1.04	

=== Melton ===
2018 Victorian state election: Melton
Party	Candidate	Votes	%	±%
Labor	Steve McGhie	14,691	34.93	−15.52
Liberal	Ryan Farrow	7,844	18.65	−12.20
Independent	Ian Birchall	4,402	10.47	+10.47
Independent	Bob Turner	4,108	9.77	+9.77
Independent	Jarrod Bingham	2,842	6.76	+6.76
Independent	Sophie Ramsey	2,260	5.37	+5.37
Greens	Harkirat Singh	1,980	4.71	−2.56
Animal Justice	Tania Milton	1,185	2.82	+2.82
Democratic Labour	Victor Bennett	1,166	2.77	+2.77
Independent	Daryl Lang	878	2.09	+2.09
Independent	Grant Stirling	424	1.01	+1.01
Victorian Socialists	Ron Guy	275	0.65	+0.65
Total formal votes		42,055	89.94	−1.93
Informal votes		4,704	10.06	+1.93
Turnout		46,759	87.72	−4.84
Two-party-preferred result
Labor	Steve McGhie	22,830	54.29	−6.93
Liberal	Ryan Farrow	19,225	45.71	+6.93
Labor hold		Swing	−6.93	

=== Mildura ===
2018 Victorian state election: Mildura
Party	Candidate	Votes	%	±%
National	Peter Crisp	14,654	39.39	−6.71
Independent	Ali Cupper	12,180	32.74	+11.45
Labor	Tony Alessi	6,404	17.21	+5.56
Independent	Steven Timmis	2,555	6.87	+6.87
Greens	Cathryn Milne	1,414	3.80	+1.96
Total formal votes		37,207	94.91	+1.96
Informal votes		1,996	5.09	−1.96
Turnout		39,203	88.29	−4.04
Two-party-preferred result
National	Peter Crisp	20,692	55.61	−14.61
Labor	Tony Alessi	16,515	44.39	+14.61
Two-candidate-preferred result
Independent	Ali Cupper	18,730	50.34	+8.38
National	Peter Crisp	18,477	49.66	−8.38
Independent gain from National		Swing	+8.38	

=== Mill Park ===
2018 Victorian state election: Mill Park
Party	Candidate	Votes	%	±%
Labor	Lily D'Ambrosio	24,729	62.71	+2.92
Liberal	Lakhwinder Singh	8,421	21.36	−5.69
Animal Justice	Marcia Simons	2,655	6.73	+6.73
Greens	Alexander Edwards	2,088	5.30	−1.63
Victorian Socialists	Nicholas Reich	1,540	3.91	+3.91
Total formal votes		39,433	93.26	−1.04
Informal votes		2,849	6.74	+1.04
Turnout		42,282	90.98	−3.17
Two-party-preferred result
Labor	Lily D'Ambrosio	29,588	74.90	+5.04
Liberal	Lakhwinder Singh	9,918	25.11	−5.04
Labor hold		Swing	+5.04	

=== Monbulk ===
2018 Victorian state election: Monbulk
Party	Candidate	Votes	%	±%
Labor	James Merlino	15,912	41.89	+4.35
Liberal	John Schurink	13,823	36.39	−3.73
Greens	Liz Hicks	5,826	15.34	+1.94
Democratic Labour	Joshua Norman	1,251	3.29	+2.14
Independent	Jordan Crook	1,176	3.10	+2.18
Total formal votes		37,988	95.15	+0.31
Informal votes		1,938	4.85	−0.31
Turnout		39,926	92.16	−2.32
Two-party-preferred result
Labor	James Merlino	22,266	58.61	+3.65
Liberal	John Schurink	15,722	41.39	−3.65
Labor hold		Swing	+3.65	

=== Mordialloc ===
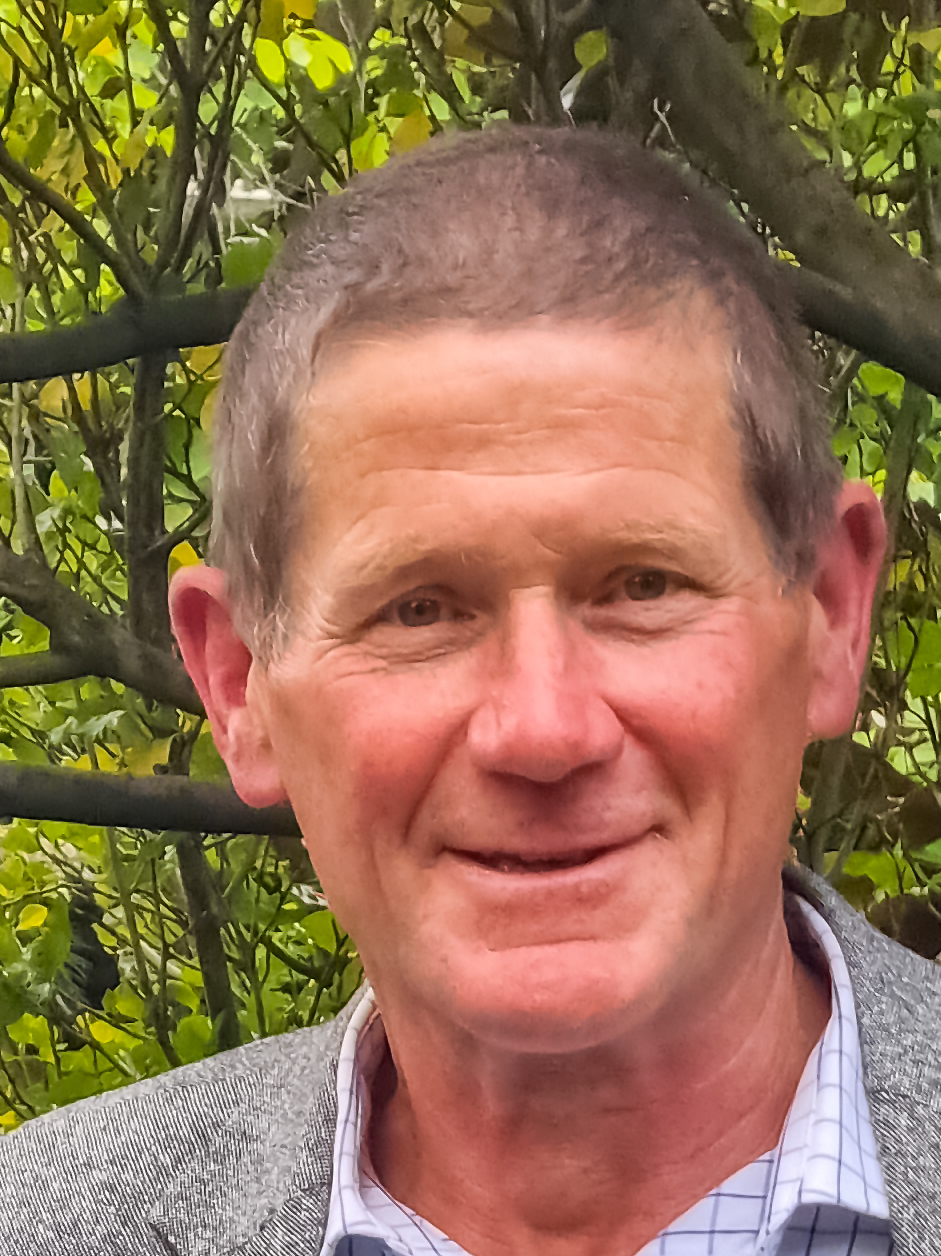
Liberal Candidate Geoff Gledhill

2018 Victorian state election: Mordialloc
Party	Candidate	Votes	%	±%
Labor	Tim Richardson	19,991	50.15	+11.46
Liberal	Geoff Gledhill	12,535	31.45	−12.37
Greens	Hamish Taylor	3,135	7.87	−0.04
Animal Justice	Bronwyn Currie	1,117	2.80	+2.80
Justice	Peter Sullivan	1,102	2.76	+2.76
Independent	Robyn Nolan	859	2.16	+2.16
Democratic Labour	Peter Phillips	643	1.61	−0.67
Transport Matters	Amit Verma	221	0.55	+0.55
Independent	Phil Reid	167	0.42	+0.42
Independent	Stephen Watson	89	0.22	+0.22
Total formal votes		39,859	93.93	+0.38
Informal votes		2,574	6.07	−0.38
Turnout		42,433	92.16	−1.85
Two-party-preferred result
Labor	Tim Richardson	25,159	62.90	+10.87
Liberal	Geoff Gledhill	14,838	37.10	−10.87
Labor hold		Swing	+10.87	

=== Mornington ===
2018 Victorian state election: Mornington
Party	Candidate	Votes	%	±%
Liberal	David Morris	20,963	50.59	−8.20
Labor	Ryan White	14,204	34.28	+6.99
Greens	David Sinclair	4,060	9.80	−1.91
Animal Justice	Tyson Jack	2,208	5.33	+5.33
Total formal votes		41,435	95.47	−0.49
Informal votes		1,964	4.53	+0.49
Turnout		43,399	91.98	−2.22
Two-party-preferred result
Liberal	David Morris	22,775	55.00	−7.61
Labor	Ryan White	18,638	45.01	+7.61
Liberal hold		Swing	−7.61	

=== Morwell ===
2018 Victorian state election: Morwell
Party	Candidate	Votes	%	±%
Labor	Mark Richards	13,725	34.19	−1.40
Independent	Russell Northe	7,851	19.56	+19.56
Liberal	Dale Harriman	4,955	12.34	+12.34
National	Sheridan Bond	4,283	10.67	−33.75
Shooters, Fishers, Farmers	Ricky Muir	2,856	7.11	+7.11
Independent	Ray Burgess	2,388	5.95	+5.95
Greens	Daniel Caffrey	1,460	3.64	−1.08
Aussie Battler	Reece Diggins	892	2.22	+2.22
Independent	Tracie Lund	841	2.10	−8.81
Democratic Labour	Nathan Keen	654	1.63	+1.63
Independent	Christine Sindt	237	0.59	+0.59
Total formal votes		40,142	92.12	−2.50
Informal votes		3,436	7.88	+2.50
Turnout		43,578	90.03	−3.38
Two-party-preferred result
Labor	Mark Richards	21,037	52.41	+4.21
National	Sheridan Bond	19,105	47.59	−4.21
Two-candidate-preferred result
Independent	Russell Northe	20,808	51.84	+51.84
Labor	Mark Richards	19,334	48.16	−0.16
Independent gain from National		Swing	N/A	

=== Mount Waverley ===
2018 Victorian state election: Mount Waverley
Party	Candidate	Votes	%	±%
Liberal	Michael Gidley	15,495	46.03	−5.12
Labor	Matt Fregon	14,722	43.74	+7.00
Greens	Justin McCarthy	3,444	10.23	+0.67
Total formal votes		33,661	94.94	−1.25
Informal votes		1,795	5.06	+1.25
Turnout		35,456	91.06	−2.23
Two-party-preferred result
Labor	Matt Fregon	17,453	51.85	+6.44
Liberal	Michael Gidley	16,208	48.15	−6.44
Labor gain from Liberal		Swing	+6.44	

=== Mulgrave ===
2018 Victorian state election: Mulgrave
Party	Candidate	Votes	%	±%
Labor	Daniel Andrews	19,649	56.73	+8.89
Liberal	Maree Davenport	11,390	32.89	−7.91
Greens	Ovi Rajasinghe	2,154	6.22	−0.82
Democratic Labour	Des Kelly	942	2.72	+2.72
Transport Matters	Nadeem Malik	499	1.44	+1.44
Total formal votes		34,634	94.29	−0.53
Informal votes		2,098	5.71	+0.53
Turnout		36,732	90.50	−2.43
Two-party-preferred result
Labor	Daniel Andrews	21,708	62.71	+8.23
Liberal	Maree Davenport	12,911	37.30	−8.23
Labor hold		Swing	+8.23	

=== Murray Plains ===
2018 Victorian state election: Murray Plains
Party	Candidate	Votes	%	±%
National	Peter Walsh	24,234	60.33	−2.94
Labor	Peter Williams	7,790	19.39	−1.00
Shooters, Fishers, Farmers	Daniel Straub	6,438	16.03	+16.03
Greens	Ian Christoe	1,706	4.25	+0.22
Total formal votes		40,168	94.59	+0.08
Informal votes		2,297	5.41	−0.08
Turnout		42,465	90.50	−3.23
Two-party-preferred result
National	Peter Walsh	29,703	73.95	+1.59
Labor	Peter Williams	10,461	26.05	−1.59
National hold		Swing	+1.59	

=== Narracan ===
2018 Victorian state election: Narracan
Party	Candidate	Votes	%	±%
Liberal	Gary Blackwood	23,207	51.72	−3.48
Labor	Christine Maxfield	15,946	35.54	+6.08
Greens	William Hornstra	2,679	5.97	−2.99
Independent	Carlo Ierfone	1,613	3.59	+3.59
Independent	Guss Lambden	1,425	3.18	+3.18
Total formal votes		44,870	94.60	−1.17
Informal votes		2,559	5.40	+1.17
Turnout		47,429	90.85	−3.22
Two-party-preferred result
Liberal	Gary Blackwood	25,724	57.26	−4.03
Labor	Christine Maxfield	19,203	42.74	+4.03
Liberal hold		Swing	−4.03	

=== Narre Warren North ===
2018 Victorian state election: Narre Warren North
Party	Candidate	Votes	%	±%
Labor	Luke Donnellan	18,790	50.12	+3.51
Liberal	Vikki Fitzgerald	13,474	35.94	−3.79
Greens	Stefanie Bauer	2,313	6.17	+0.51
Democratic Labour	Sami Greiss	1,680	4.48	+3.07
Transport Matters	Zeeshan Mahmood	1,234	3.29	+3.29
Total formal votes		37,491	93.35	+0.10
Informal votes		2,670	6.65	−0.10
Turnout		40,161	89.80	−2.81
Two-party-preferred result
Labor	Luke Donnellan	22,426	59.76	+5.19
Liberal	Vikki Fitzgerald	15,103	40.24	−5.19
Labor hold		Swing	+5.19	

=== Narre Warren South ===
2018 Victorian state election: Narre Warren South
Party	Candidate	Votes	%	±%
Labor	Gary Maas	20,797	49.93	+1.75
Liberal	Susan Serey	15,822	37.99	−2.06
Greens	Michael Butler	2,714	6.52	+0.43
Transport Matters	Gagandeep Singh	2,317	5.56	+5.56
Total formal votes		41,650	93.35	−1.02
Informal votes		2,967	6.65	+1.02
Turnout		44,617	90.12	−3.49
Two-party-preferred result
Labor	Gary Maas	23,690	56.90	+1.40
Liberal	Susan Serey	17,948	43.11	−1.40
Labor hold		Swing	+1.40	

=== Nepean ===
2018 Victorian state election: Nepean
Party	Candidate	Votes	%	±%
Liberal	Russell Joseph	18,570	43.95	−9.38
Labor	Chris Brayne	15,835	37.47	+6.33
Greens	Paul Saunders	5,080	12.02	+0.18
Independent	Simon Mulvany	1,776	4.20	+4.20
Independent	Rodger Gully	996	2.36	+2.36
Total formal votes		42,257	94.73	−0.31
Informal votes		2,353	5.27	+0.31
Turnout		44,610	89.84	−2.85
Two-party-preferred result
Labor	Chris Brayne	21,512	50.91	+8.54
Liberal	Russell Joseph	20,745	49.09	−8.54
Labor gain from Liberal		Swing	+8.54	

=== Niddrie ===
2018 Victorian state election: Niddrie
Party	Candidate	Votes	%	±%
Labor	Ben Carroll	21,042	54.79	+8.64
Liberal	Ben Reeson	13,121	34.16	−3.36
Greens	Jean-Luke Desmarais	2,629	6.85	−1.26
Animal Justice	Rebbecca Primmer	1,615	4.21	+4.20
Total formal votes		38,407	94.38	+0.78
Informal votes		2,289	5.62	−0.78
Turnout		40,696	91.01	−3.35
Two-party-preferred result
Labor	Ben Carroll	24,021	62.59	+4.88
Liberal	Ben Reeson	14,358	37.41	−4.88
Labor hold		Swing	+4.88	

=== Northcote ===
2018 Victorian state election: Northcote
Party	Candidate	Votes	%	±%
Labor	Kat Theophanous	17,748	41.71	+0.73
Greens	Lidia Thorpe	16,816	39.52	+3.24
Liberal	John MacIsaac	4,570	10.74	−5.74
Reason	Franca Smarrelli	1,448	3.40	+3.40
Animal Justice	David Bramante	1,026	2.41	+0.67
Liberal Democrats	Samuel Fink	500	1.18	+1.18
Independent	Bryony Edwards	444	1.04	+0.21
Total formal votes		42,552	95.70	−0.08
Informal votes		1,911	4.30	+0.08
Turnout		44,463	91.05	−0.61
Two-party-preferred result
Labor	Kat Theophanous	35,417	83.23	+3.41
Liberal	John MacIsaac	7,135	16.77	−3.41
Two-candidate-preferred result
Labor	Kat Theophanous	22,004	51.71	−4.33
Greens	Lidia Thorpe	20,548	48.29	+4.33
Labor gain from Greens		Swing	−4.33	

=== Oakleigh ===
2018 Victorian state election: Oakleigh
Party	Candidate	Votes	%	±%
Labor	Steve Dimopoulos	19,202	53.57	+7.82
Liberal	Andrew Edmonds	10,946	30.54	−7.74
Greens	Peter Morgan	3,897	10.87	−2.41
Animal Justice	Suzanne Parker	835	2.33	+2.33
Sustainable Australia	Brandon Hoult	594	1.66	+1.66
Independent	Parashos Kioupelis	373	1.04	+0.29
Total formal votes		35,847	95.42	−0.02
Informal votes		1,720	4.58	+0.02
Turnout		37,567	90.32	−1.76
Two-party-preferred result
Labor	Steve Dimopoulos	23,587	65.78	+7.60
Liberal	Andrew Edmonds	12,268	34.22	−7.60
Labor hold		Swing	+7.60	

=== Ovens Valley ===
2018 Victorian state election: Ovens Valley
Party	Candidate	Votes	%	±%
National	Tim McCurdy	16,646	44.46	−10.99
Labor	Kate Doyle	7,703	20.58	−1.58
Independent	Tammy Atkins	7,174	19.16	+19.16
Country	Julian Fidge	3,214	8.59	+8.59
Greens	Vicki Berry	1,687	4.51	−5.54
Total formal votes		37,437	94.67	−0.84
Informal votes		2,108	5.33	+0.84
Turnout		39,545	91.54	−2.13
Two-party-preferred result
National	Tim McCurdy	23,500	62.63	−3.94
Labor	Kate Doyle	14,025	37.38	+3.94
National hold		Swing	−3.94	

=== Pascoe Vale ===
2018 Victorian state election: Pascoe Vale
Party	Candidate	Votes	%	±%
Labor	Lizzie Blandthorn	15,904	37.74	−9.96
Independent	Oscar Yildiz	9,908	23.51	+23.51
Greens	Phil Jackson	5,451	12.94	−3.34
Liberal	Genevieve Hamilton	4,812	11.42	−15.18
Independent	John Kavanagh	3,242	7.69	+7.69
Victorian Socialists	Gerry Beaton	1,277	3.03	−0.19
Animal Justice	Graeme Linsell	839	1.99	+1.99
Independent	Francesco Timpano	707	1.68	+1.68
Total formal votes		42,140	92.90	−0.73
Informal votes		3,220	7.10	+0.73
Turnout		45,360	88.66	−2.49
Two-party-preferred result
Labor	Lizzie Blandthorn	28,790	68.32	+1.55
Liberal	Genevieve Hamilton	13,350	31.68	−1.55
Two-candidate-preferred result
Labor	Lizzie Blandthorn	24,684	58.58	−8.20
Independent	Oscar Yildiz	17,456	41.42	+41.42
Labor hold		Swing	N/A	

=== Polwarth ===
2018 Victorian state election: Polwarth
Party	Candidate	Votes	%	±%
Liberal	Richard Riordan	20,629	51.14	−4.26
Labor	Douglas Johnston	13,338	33.06	+5.08
Greens	Courtney Gardner	3,949	9.79	−1.24
Animal Justice	Damien Pitts	1,636	4.06	+4.06
Victorian Socialists	Brendan Murphy	788	1.95	+1.95
Total formal votes		40,340	95.00	−1.10
Informal votes		2,122	5.00	+1.10
Turnout		42,462	92.52	−2.36
Two-party-preferred result
Liberal	Richard Riordan	22,360	55.40	−5.24
Labor	Douglas Johnston	17,999	44.60	+5.24
Liberal hold		Swing	−5.24	

=== Prahran ===
2018 Victorian state election: Prahran
Party	Candidate	Votes	%	±%
Liberal	Katie Allen	13,956	34.53	−10.29
Labor	Neil Pharaoh	11,702	28.95	+3.04
Greens	Sam Hibbins	11,347	28.07	+3.32
Democratic Labour	Leon Kofmansky	933	2.31	+2.31
Animal Justice	Jennifer Long	900	2.23	−0.04
Reason	Tom Tomlin	830	2.05	+2.05
Sustainable Australia	Dennis Bilic	468	1.16	+1.16
Aussie Battler	Wendy Patterson	156	0.39	+0.39
Independent	Alan Menadue	130	0.32	+0.10
Total formal votes		40,422	94.77	−0.12
Informal votes		2,229	5.23	+0.12
Turnout		42,651	84.67	−3.80
Two-party-preferred result
Labor	Neil Pharaoh	23,263	57.55	+7.58
Liberal	Katie Allen	17,159	42.45	−7.58
Two-candidate-preferred result
Greens	Sam Hibbins	23,224	57.45	+7.08
Liberal	Katie Allen	17,198	42.55	−7.08
Greens hold		Swing	+7.08	

=== Preston ===
2018 Victorian state election: Preston
Party	Candidate	Votes	%	±%
Labor	Robin Scott	19,409	51.97	+3.55
Liberal	Guido Lilio	6,083	16.29	−4.87
Greens	Susanne Newton	5,636	15.09	−1.05
Independent	Gaetano Greco	2,570	6.88	+6.88
Victorian Socialists	Stephanie Price	1,453	3.89	+3.89
Reason	Margee Glover	1,116	2.99	+2.99
Animal Justice	Nadine Richings	1,079	2.89	+2.89
Total formal votes		37,346	93.29	−1.39
Informal votes		2,687	6.71	+1.39
Turnout		40,033	88.46	−2.34
Two-party-preferred result
Labor	Robin Scott	29,318	78.50	+3.85
Liberal	Guido Lilio	8,028	21.50	−3.85
Two-candidate-preferred result
Labor	Robin Scott	26,372	70.70	−3.95
Greens	Susanne Newton	10,928	29.30	+3.95
Labor hold		Swing	−3.95	

=== Richmond ===
2018 Victorian state election: Richmond
Party	Candidate	Votes	%	±%
Labor	Richard Wynne	19,705	44.39	+11.10
Greens	Kathleen Maltzahn	15,197	34.23	+2.77
Reason	Judy Ryan	2,916	6.57	+3.24
Independent Liberal	Kevin Quoc Tran	2,698	6.08	+6.08
Independent	Herschel Landes	1,340	3.02	+3.02
Animal Justice	Craig Kealy	1,268	2.86	+1.41
Independent	Emma Manning	811	1.83	+1.83
Independent	Adrian Whitehead	459	1.03	+1.03
Total formal votes		44,394	94.10	−2.18
Informal votes		2,783	5.90	+2.18
Turnout		47,177	86.28	−2.93
Two-candidate-preferred result
Labor	Richard Wynne	24,620	55.46	+3.60
Greens	Kathleen Maltzahn	19,774	44.54	−3.60
Labor hold		Swing	+3.60	

=== Ringwood ===
2018 Victorian state election: Ringwood
Party	Candidate	Votes	%	±%
Liberal	Dee Ryall	15,883	44.21	−3.90
Labor	Dustin Halse	15,121	42.08	+9.60
Greens	Robert Humphreys	4,926	13.71	+2.95
Total formal votes		35,930	94.83	−0.83
Informal votes		1,958	5.17	+0.83
Turnout		37,888	91.74	−2.03
Two-party-preferred result
Labor	Dustin Halse	18,978	52.82	+7.89
Liberal	Dee Ryall	16,952	47.18	−7.89
Labor gain from Liberal		Swing	+7.89	

=== Ripon ===
2018 Victorian state election: Ripon
Party	Candidate	Votes	%	±%
Liberal	Louise Staley	15,594	38.93	+6.18
Labor	Sarah De Santis	15,280	38.15	+3.05
Shooters, Fishers, Farmers	Peter Fava	2,622	6.55	+6.55
Justice	Sandra Gibbs	1,929	4.82	+4.82
Greens	Serge Simic	1,667	4.16	−2.97
Democratic Labour	Peter Mulcahy	1,315	3.28	+2.06
Animal Justice	Anna Hills	835	2.08	+2.08
Independent	Jeff Truscott	377	0.94	+0.94
Victorian Socialists	Bronwyn Jennings	219	0.55	+0.55
Independent	Maria Mayer	217	0.54	+0.54
Total formal votes		40,055	91.74	−1.87
Informal votes		3,606	8.26	+1.87
Turnout		43,661	91.39	−3.39
Two-party-preferred result
Liberal	Louise Staley	20,035	50.02	−0.99
Labor	Sarah De Santis	20,020	49.98	+0.99
Liberal hold		Swing	−0.99	

=== Rowville ===
2018 Victorian state election: Rowville
Party	Candidate	Votes	%	±%
Liberal	Kim Wells	17,551	50.39	−3.45
Labor	Muhammad Shahbaz	11,940	34.28	−1.37
Greens	Natasha Sharma	3,483	10.00	+2.63
Independent	Joe Cossari	1,858	5.33	+5.33
Total formal votes		34,832	94.04	−0.42
Informal votes		2,207	5.96	+0.42
Turnout		37,039	92.85	−2.13
Two-party-preferred result
Liberal	Kim Wells	19,373	55.69	−2.72
Labor	Muhammad Shahbaz	15,416	44.31	+2.72
Liberal hold		Swing	−2.72	

=== Sandringham ===
2018 Victorian state election: Sandringham
Party	Candidate	Votes	%	±%
Liberal	Brad Rowswell	16,770	42.70	−8.88
Labor	Anita Horvath	12,918	32.89	+8.52
Independent	Clarke Martin	3,317	8.45	+8.45
Greens	Dominic Phillips	3,201	8.15	−5.62
Animal Justice	Snezana Redford	1,310	3.34	+3.34
Democratic Labour	Liz Freeman	1,149	2.93	+2.93
Sustainable Australia	Creighton King	609	1.55	+1.55
Total formal votes		39,274	95.18	−1.29
Informal votes		1,990	4.82	+1.29
Turnout		41,264	91.66	−1.74
Two-party-preferred result
Liberal	Brad Rowswell	19,891	50.65	−6.69
Labor	Anita Horvath	19,383	49.35	+6.69
Liberal hold		Swing	−6.69	

=== Shepparton ===
2018 Victorian state election: Shepparton
Party	Candidate	Votes	%	±%
Independent	Suzanna Sheed	15,856	38.40	+5.68
Liberal	Cheryl Hammer	10,967	26.56	+26.56
National	Peter Schwarz	5,382	13.03	−22.32
Labor	Bill Heath	4,772	11.56	−6.32
Shooters, Fishers, Farmers	Murray Willaton	3,314	8.03	+8.03
Greens	Nickee Freeman	999	2.42	−0.96
Total formal votes		41,290	94.52	+0.36
Informal votes		2,396	5.48	−0.36
Turnout		43,686	89.58	−3.24
Two-party-preferred result
Liberal	Cheryl Hammer	25,484	61.72	−1.56
Labor	Bill Heath	15,806	38.28	+1.56
Two-candidate-preferred result
Independent	Suzanna Sheed	22,833	55.30	+2.67
Liberal	Cheryl Hammer	18,457	44.70	+44.70
Independent hold		Swing	N/A	

=== South Barwon ===
2018 Victorian state election: South Barwon
Party	Candidate	Votes	%	±%
Liberal	Andrew Katos	18,180	37.61	−8.64
Labor	Darren Cheeseman	18,003	37.25	+3.86
Greens	Marian Smedley	4,164	8.62	−3.70
Independent	Damien Cole	3,699	7.65	+7.65
Animal Justice	Peter Oseckas	1,474	3.05	+1.14
Democratic Labour	Stephen Campbell	1,461	3.02	+1.87
Shooters, Fishers, Farmers	Robert Ripa	998	2.06	+2.06
Victorian Socialists	David Ball	355	0.73	+0.73
Total formal votes		48,334	95.50	−0.59
Informal votes		2,275	4.50	+0.59
Turnout		50,609	93.30	−1.60
Two-party-preferred result
Labor	Darren Cheeseman	26,389	54.60	+7.46
Liberal	Andrew Katos	21,945	45.40	−7.46
Labor gain from Liberal		Swing	+7.46	

=== South-West Coast ===
2018 Victorian state election: South-West Coast
Party	Candidate	Votes	%	±%
Liberal	Roma Britnell	13,297	32.38	−24.59
Labor	Kylie Gaston	10,074	24.53	−3.68
Independent	James Purcell	6,763	16.47	+16.47
Independent	Michael Neoh	3,735	9.10	+9.10
Country	Jim Doukas	3,352	8.16	+8.16
Greens	Thomas Campbell	2,540	6.19	−3.61
Democratic Labour	Joseph Purtill	682	1.66	+1.66
Independent	Michael McCluskey	384	0.94	−0.67
Victorian Socialists	Terry Riggs	238	0.58	+0.58
Total formal votes		41,065	93.31	−2.65
Informal votes		2,943	6.69	+2.65
Turnout		44,008	92.65	−2.28
Two-party-preferred result
Liberal	Roma Britnell	21,483	52.31	−8.66
Labor	Kylie Gaston	19,582	47.69	+8.66
Liberal hold		Swing	−8.66	

=== St Albans ===
2018 Victorian state election: St Albans
Party	Candidate	Votes	%	±%
Labor	Natalie Suleyman	22,355	59.67	+3.27
Liberal	Trung Luu	9,116	24.33	−2.55
Greens	Cylene Magri	4,600	12.28	+3.13
Independent	Jenny Isa	1,393	3.72	+3.72
Total formal votes		37,464	92.75	+0.58
Informal votes		2,927	7.25	−0.58
Turnout		40,391	86.53	−3.02
Two-party-preferred result
Labor	Natalie Suleyman	26,326	71.54	+4.04
Liberal	Trung Luu	10,475	28.46	−4.04
Labor hold		Swing	+4.04	

=== Sunbury ===
2018 Victorian state election: Sunbury
Party	Candidate	Votes	%	±%
Labor	Josh Bull	22,749	58.40	+14.30
Liberal	Cassandra Marr	13,178	33.83	−2.26
Greens	Ryan Keable	3,028	7.77	−0.09
Total formal votes		38,955	94.02	−0.28
Informal votes		2,476	5.98	+0.28
Turnout		41,431	90.88	−3.04
Two-party-preferred result
Labor	Josh Bull	25,011	64.33	+10.03
Liberal	Cassandra Marr	13,868	35.67	−10.03
Labor hold		Swing	+10.03	

=== Sydenham ===
2018 Victorian state election: Sydenham
Party	Candidate	Votes	%	±%
Labor	Natalie Hutchins	26,264	60.94	+3.57
Liberal	Maria Kerr	12,303	28.54	+0.53
Greens	Clinton Hare	2,754	6.39	−0.71
Independent	Ramanjit Singh	1,780	4.13	+4.13
Total formal votes		43,101	92.83	−0.55
Informal votes		3,329	7.17	+0.55
Turnout		46,430	91.32	−2.42
Two-party-preferred result
Labor	Natalie Hutchins	29,018	67.86	+1.60
Liberal	Maria Kerr	13,743	32.14	−1.60
Labor hold		Swing	+1.60	

=== Tarneit ===
2018 Victorian state election: Tarneit
Party	Candidate	Votes	%	±%
Labor	Sarah Connolly	25,084	56.20	+9.40
Liberal	Glenn Goodfellow	11,460	25.67	−0.72
Greens	Beck Sheffield-Brotherton	3,398	7.61	−1.40
Independent	Arnav Sati	1,740	3.90	+3.90
Independent	Harkamal Batth	1,145	2.57	+2.57
Independent	Aaron An	1,006	2.25	+2.25
Independent	Zulfi Syed	802	1.80	+1.80
Total formal votes		44,635	92.86	+0.94
Informal votes		3,432	7.14	−0.94
Turnout		48,067	89.21	−3.03
Two-party-preferred result
Labor	Sarah Connolly	30,525	68.02	+3.44
Liberal	Glenn Goodfellow	14,350	31.98	−3.44
Labor hold		Swing	+3.44	

=== Thomastown ===
2018 Victorian state election: Thomastown
Party	Candidate	Votes	%	±%
Labor	Bronwyn Halfpenny	21,397	61.69	−5.01
Liberal	Gurdawar Singh	5,420	15.63	−1.35
Independent	Nikola Stavreski	1,867	5.38	+5.38
Independent	Alahna Desiato	1,552	4.47	+4.47
Greens	Cynthia Smith	1,474	4.25	−0.95
Victorian Socialists	Kath Larkin	967	2.79	+2.79
Animal Justice	Tess Nagorka-Tsindos	861	2.48	+2.48
Independent	Ibrahim Saba	593	1.71	+1.71
Reason	David Thirkettle-Watts	554	1.60	+1.60
Total formal votes		34,685	87.74	−5.23
Informal votes		4,847	12.26	+5.23
Turnout		39,532	88.60	−3.67
Two-party-preferred result
Labor	Bronwyn Halfpenny	26,639	77.19	−1.25
Liberal	Gurdawar Singh	7,873	22.81	+1.25
Labor hold		Swing	−1.25	

=== Warrandyte ===
2018 Victorian state election: Warrandyte
Party	Candidate	Votes	%	±%
Liberal	Ryan Smith	18,852	49.76	−7.13
Labor	Elizabeth McGrath	13,395	35.36	+6.14
Greens	Ben Ramcharan	3,927	10.37	−0.07
Animal Justice	Lachlan McGill	1,710	4.51	+4.51
Total formal votes		37,884	95.20	−0.07
Informal votes		1,909	4.80	+0.07
Turnout		39,793	91.94	−2.35
Two-party-preferred result
Liberal	Ryan Smith	20,402	53.88	−7.72
Labor	Elizabeth McGrath	17,464	46.12	+7.72
Liberal hold		Swing	−7.72	

=== Wendouree ===
2018 Victorian state election: Wendouree
Party	Candidate	Votes	%	±%
Labor	Juliana Addison	18,616	49.39	+6.15
Liberal	Amy Johnson	13,270	35.21	−4.45
Greens	Alice Barnes	3,647	9.68	−0.31
Animal Justice	Bryn Hills	1,303	3.46	+3.46
Independent	Alison May Smith	473	1.25	+1.25
Victorian Socialists	Jeremy Smith	382	1.01	+1.01
Total formal votes		37,691	94.38	−0.75
Informal votes		2,246	5.62	+0.75
Turnout		39,937	91.65	−2.54
Two-party-preferred result
Labor	Juliana Addison	22,751	60.26	+4.47
Liberal	Amy Johnson	15,005	39.74	−4.47
Labor hold		Swing	+4.47	

=== Werribee ===
2018 Victorian state election: Werribee
Party	Candidate	Votes	%	±%
Labor	Tim Pallas	17,539	45.41	−11.20
Independent	Joe Garra	7,685	19.90	+19.90
Liberal	Gayle Murphy	6,641	17.19	−11.55
Greens	Jay Dessi	2,522	6.53	−1.96
Independent	Rachel Carling-Jenkins	2,086	5.40	+5.40
Democratic Labour	Kathryn Breakwell	1,175	3.04	+3.04
Independent	Pratibha Sharma	628	1.63	+1.63
Independent	Thanh Nga Ly	346	0.90	+0.90
Total formal votes		38,622	93.25	−0.38
Informal votes		2,796	6.75	+0.38
Turnout		41,418	89.49	−3.25
Two-party-preferred result
Labor	Tim Pallas	24,209	62.55	−3.10
Liberal	Gayle Murphy	14,494	37.45	+3.10
Two-candidate-preferred result
Labor	Tim Pallas	22,701	58.78	−6.92
Independent	Joe Garra	15,921	41.22	+41.22
Labor hold		Swing	N/A	

=== Williamstown ===
2018 Victorian state election: Williamstown
Party	Candidate	Votes	%	±%
Labor	Melissa Horne	21,839	50.36	+5.72
Liberal	Pallavee Joshi	7,832	18.06	−9.98
Greens	Sam Long	6,960	16.05	−4.67
Independent	Peter Hemphill	4,407	10.16	+10.16
Animal Justice	Virginia Saint-James	1,251	2.88	+2.88
Independent	Lisa Bentley	1,081	2.49	+2.49
Total formal votes		43,370	95.23	+0.24
Informal votes		2,173	4.77	−0.24
Turnout		45,543	89.44	−2.65
Two-party-preferred result
Labor	Melissa Horne	31,273	72.07	+5.53
Liberal	Pallavee Joshi	12,118	27.93	−5.53
Labor hold		Swing	+5.53	

=== Yan Yean ===
2018 Victorian state election: Yan Yean
Party	Candidate	Votes	%	±%
Labor	Danielle Green	26,717	54.30	+11.29
Liberal	Meralyn Klein	13,324	27.08	−14.77
Greens	Hugh McKinnon	3,354	6.82	−0.42
Shooters, Fishers, Farmers	David Snelling	2,244	4.56	+4.56
Democratic Labour	Arthur Bablis	1,845	3.75	+3.75
Liberty Alliance	Siobhann Brown	1,232	2.50	+2.50
Independent	Yassin Albarri	254	0.52	+0.52
Independent	Munish Bansal	234	0.48	+0.48
Total formal votes		49,204	92.50	−2.39
Informal votes		3,987	7.50	+2.39
Turnout		53,191	91.46	−3.90
Two-party-preferred result
Labor	Danielle Green	32,999	67.03	+13.37
Liberal	Meralyn Klein	16,234	32.97	−13.37
Labor hold		Swing	+13.37	

=== Yuroke ===
2018 Victorian state election: Yuroke
Party	Candidate	Votes	%	±%
Labor	Ros Spence	28,519	59.42	+5.33
Liberal	Jim Overend	12,692	26.44	+2.83
Greens	Louise Sampson	3,070	6.40	+0.38
Independent	Golda Zogheib	2,102	4.38	+4.38
Victorian Socialists	Emma Dook	1,612	3.36	+3.36
Total formal votes		47,995	93.11	−0.39
Informal votes		3,549	6.89	+0.39
Turnout		51,544	88.76	−3.68
Two-party-preferred result
Labor	Ros Spence	33,730	70.26	+1.74
Liberal	Jim Overend	14,278	29.74	−1.74
Labor hold		Swing	+1.74	
