= Electoral results for the district of Bayswater =

Victoria, Australia, district election results

This is a list of electoral results for the district of Bayswater in Victorian state elections.

== Members for Bayswater ==
Member	Party	Term
Gordon Ashley	Liberal	1992–2002
Peter Lockwood	Labor	2002–2006
Heidi Victoria	Liberal	2006–2018
Jackson Taylor	Labor	2018–present

== Election results ==
=== Elections in the 2020s ===
==== 2022 ====
2022 Victorian state election: Bayswater
Party	Candidate	Votes	%	±%
Labor	Jackson Taylor	17,609	41.3	+0.5
Liberal	Nick Wakeling	15,174	35.6	−12.1
Greens	Nadia Sirninger Rankin	3,151	7.4	−1.4
Legalise Cannabis	Ashley Heap	1,653	3.9	+3.9
Family First	Gary Coombes	1,397	3.3	+3.3
Democratic Labour	Thomas Dolan	948	2.2	+2.2
Freedom	Chris Field	937	2.2	+2.2
Independent	Chloe Mackallah	890	2.1	+2.1
Animal Justice	Alyssa Wormald	840	2.0	−0.6
Total formal votes		42,599	94.4	+0.0
Informal votes		2,512	5.6	−0.0
Turnout		45,111	90.8	−0.4
Two-party-preferred result
Labor	Jackson Taylor	23,101	54.2	+4.8
Liberal	Nick Wakeling	19,498	45.8	−4.8
Labor notional gain from Liberal		Swing	+4.8	

=== Elections in the 2010s ===
==== 2018 ====
2018 Victorian state election: Bayswater
Party	Candidate	Votes	%	±%
Liberal	Heidi Victoria	17,650	46.29	−3.00
Labor	Jackson Taylor	15,548	40.78	+6.90
Greens	Asher Cookson	3,228	8.47	−0.33
Animal Justice	Nathan Schram	1,700	4.46	+1.02
Total formal votes		38,126	94.70	−0.23
Informal votes		2,135	5.30	+0.23
Turnout		40,261	91.40	−2.70
Two-party-preferred result
Labor	Jackson Taylor	19,211	50.39	+5.01
Liberal	Heidi Victoria	18,915	49.61	−5.01
Labor gain from Liberal		Swing	+5.01	

==== 2014 ====
2014 Victorian state election: Bayswater
Party	Candidate	Votes	%	±%
Liberal	Heidi Victoria	18,811	49.3	−0.9
Labor	Tony Dib	12,927	33.9	+1.0
Greens	James Tennant	3,355	8.8	−0.1
Animal Justice	Robert Smyth	1,313	3.4	+3.4
Christians	Tristan Conway	785	2.1	+2.1
Country Alliance	Jeremy Cass	583	1.5	+1.0
Independent	John Carbonari	385	1.0	+1.0
Total formal votes		38,159	94.9	−0.4
Informal votes		2,040	5.1	+0.4
Turnout		40,199	94.1	+1.1
Two-party-preferred result
Liberal	Heidi Victoria	20,854	54.6	−2.1
Labor	Tony Dib	17,323	45.4	+2.1
Liberal hold		Swing	−2.1	

==== 2010 ====
2010 Victorian state election: Bayswater
Party	Candidate	Votes	%	±%
Liberal	Heidi Victoria	17,597	52.85	+11.76
Labor	Peter Lockwood	10,138	30.45	−5.65
Greens	James Tennant	2,873	8.63	+0.74
Sex Party	Sotiria Stratis	1,256	3.77	+3.77
Family First	Gary Coombes	973	2.92	−1.09
Democratic Labor	Ronald Prendergast	456	1.37	+1.37
Total formal votes		33,293	95.47	+1.22
Informal votes		1,579	4.53	−1.22
Turnout		34,872	93.99	+0.42
Two-party-preferred result
Liberal	Heidi Victoria	20,178	60.57	+7.68
Labor	Peter Lockwood	13,134	39.43	−7.68
Liberal hold		Swing	+7.68	

=== Elections in the 2000s ===
==== 2006 ====
2006 Victorian state election: Bayswater
Party	Candidate	Votes	%	±%
Liberal	Heidi Victoria	13,162	41.09	−3.04
Labor	Peter Lockwood	11,563	36.10	−9.61
Independent	Gordon Ashley	2,935	9.16	+9.16
Greens	James Tennant	2,526	7.89	−2.27
Family First	Warwick Murphy	1,285	4.01	+4.01
People Power	Stephanie Mortimer	334	1.04	+1.04
Independent	Steve Raskovy	157	0.49	+0.49
Citizens Electoral Council	Kurt Beilharz	67	0.21	+0.21
Total formal votes		32,029	94.25	−3.12
Informal votes		1,955	5.75	+3.12
Turnout		33,984	93.57	−0.55
Two-party-preferred result
Liberal	Heidi Victoria	16,982	52.83	+5.58
Labor	Peter Lockwood	15,164	47.17	−5.58
Liberal gain from Labor		Swing	+5.58	

==== 2002 ====
2002 Victorian state election: Bayswater
Party	Candidate	Votes	%	±%
Labor	Peter Lockwood	15,215	45.7	+4.0
Liberal	Gordon Ashley	14,689	44.1	−11.0
Greens	Jill Bannan	3,380	10.2	+10.2
Total formal votes		33,284	97.4	−0.1
Informal votes		898	2.6	+0.1
Turnout		34,182	94.1	
Two-party-preferred result
Labor	Peter Lockwood	17,553	52.7	+9.0
Liberal	Gordon Ashley	15,731	47.3	−9.0
Labor gain from Liberal		Swing	+9.0	

=== Elections in the 1990s ===
==== 1999 ====
1999 Victorian state election: Bayswater
Party	Candidate	Votes	%	±%
Liberal	Gordon Ashley	17,165	53.2	−2.8
Labor	Susan Craven	13,732	42.5	+1.4
Hope	James Bristow	1,380	4.3	+4.3
Total formal votes		32,277	97.6	−0.5
Informal votes		786	2.4	+0.5
Turnout		33,063	93.3	
Two-party-preferred result
Liberal	Gordon Ashley	17,654	54.7	−2.8
Labor	Susan Craven	14,623	45.3	+2.8
Liberal hold		Swing	−2.8	

==== 1996 ====
1996 Victorian state election: Bayswater
Party	Candidate	Votes	%	±%
Liberal	Gordon Ashley	17,843	56.0	+2.2
Labor	Barbara Lewis	13,115	41.1	+4.0
Natural Law	Maggie Lawrence	920	2.9	+2.9
Total formal votes		31,878	98.1	+1.4
Informal votes		605	1.9	−1.4
Turnout		32,483	94.3	
Two-party-preferred result
Liberal	Gordon Ashley	18,311	57.5	+0.4
Labor	Barbara Lewis	13,546	42.5	−0.4
Liberal hold		Swing	+0.4	

==== 1992 ====
1992 Victorian state election: Bayswater
Party	Candidate	Votes	%	±%
Liberal	Gordon Ashley	16,806	53.8	+11.0
Labor	Kay Setches	11,586	37.1	−11.3
Independent	Norma Corr	2,844	9.1	+9.1
Total formal votes		31,236	96.8	−0.2
Informal votes		1,039	3.2	+0.2
Turnout		32,275	95.2	
Two-party-preferred result
Liberal	Gordon Ashley	17,807	57.1	+10.1
Labor	Kay Setches	13,365	42.9	−10.1
Liberal gain from Labor		Swing	+10.1	
