= Electoral results for the district of Ringwood =

Victoria, Australia, district election results

This is a list of electoral results for the Electoral district of Ringwood in Victorian state elections.

== Members for Ringwood ==
First incarnation (1958–1992)
Member	Party	Term
Jim Manson	Liberal	1958–1973
Norman Lacy	Liberal	1973–1976
Peter McArthur	Liberal	1976–1982
Kay Setches	Labor	1982–1992
Second incarnation (2014–present)
Member	Party	Term
Dee Ryall	Liberal	2014–2018
Dustin Halse	Labor	2018–2022
Will Fowles	Labor	2022–2023
Will Fowles	Independent Labor	2023–2024
Will Fowles	Independent	2024–present

== Election results ==
=== Elections in the 2020s ===
2022 Victorian state election: Ringwood
Party	Candidate	Votes	%	±%
Labor	Will Fowles	17,851	39.0	−3.3
Liberal	Cynthia Watson	15,467	33.8	−9.9
Greens	Reuben Steen	7,105	15.5	+2.1
Democratic Labour	Gary Ryan	1,684	3.7	+3.7
Family First	Richard Griffith-Jones	1,396	3.1	+3.1
Animal Justice	Nick Rowe	1,212	2.6	+2.2
Freedom	Robyn M. Siemer	1,038	2.3	+2.3
Total formal votes		45753	96.5	+1.5
Informal votes		1,676	3.5	−1.5
Turnout		47429	91.1	−0.2
Two-party-preferred result
Labor	Will Fowles	26,322	57.5	+4.3
Liberal	Cynthia Watson	19,431	42.5	−4.3
Labor hold		Swing	+4.3	

=== Elections in the 2010s ===
2018 Victorian state election: Ringwood
Party	Candidate	Votes	%	±%
Liberal	Dee Ryall	15,883	44.21	−3.90
Labor	Dustin Halse	15,121	42.08	+9.60
Greens	Robert Humphreys	4,926	13.71	+2.95
Total formal votes		35,930	94.83	−0.83
Informal votes		1,958	5.17	+0.83
Turnout		37,888	91.74	−2.03
Two-party-preferred result
Labor	Dustin Halse	18,978	52.82	+7.89
Liberal	Dee Ryall	16,952	47.18	−7.89
Labor gain from Liberal		Swing	+7.89	

2014 Victorian state election: Ringwood
Party	Candidate	Votes	%	±%
Liberal	Dee Ryall	17,440	48.1	−1.6
Labor	Tony Clark	11,777	32.5	+0.7
Greens	Brendan Powell	3,903	10.8	−1.1
Independent	Michael Challinger	1,440	4.0	+4.0
Christians	Karen Dobby	1,131	3.1	+3.1
People Power Victoria	Steve Raskovy	287	0.8	+0.8
Country Alliance	Brian Dungey	279	0.8	+0.8
Total formal votes		36,257	95.7	−0.6
Informal votes		1,643	4.3	+0.6
Turnout		37,900	93.8	−1.1
Two-party-preferred result
Liberal	Dee Ryall	19,919	55.1	−1.2
Labor	Tony Clark	16,250	44.9	+1.2
Liberal hold		Swing	−1.2	

=== Elections in the 1980s ===
1988 Victorian state election: Ringwood
Party	Candidate	Votes	%	±%
Labor	Kay Setches	13,203	46.9	−5.8
Liberal	Bruce Camfield	12,383	44.0	−3.3
Democrats	Sid Spindler	1,270	4.5	+4.5
Call to Australia	Mark Ansell	783	2.8	+2.8
Independent	James Cockell	515	1.8	+1.8
Total formal votes		28,154	97.1	−0.8
Informal votes		842	2.9	+0.8
Turnout		28,996	92.9	−0.9
Two-party-preferred result
Labor	Kay Setches	14,358	51.7	−1.0
Liberal	Bruce Camfield	13,606	48.3	+1.0
Labor hold		Swing	−1.0	

1985 Victorian state election: Ringwood
Party	Candidate	Votes	%	±%
Labor	Kay Setches	14,466	52.7	+5.5
Liberal	Michael Dobson	12,986	47.3	+6.8
Total formal votes		27,452	97.9	
Informal votes		593	2.1	
Turnout		28,045	93.9	
Labor hold		Swing	+0.1	

1982 Victorian state election: Ringwood
Party	Candidate	Votes	%	±%
Labor	Kay Setches	13,659	46.3	+5.4
Liberal	Peter McArthur	12,123	41.1	−6.7
Democrats	Michael Nardella	2,091	7.1	−3.1
Independent	Robin Gardini	694	2.4	+2.4
Democratic Labor	John Garratt	655	2.2	+2.2
Independent	Wilfrid Thiele	271	0.9	+0.9
Total formal votes		29,493	97.8	+0.2
Informal votes		669	2.2	−0.2
Turnout		30,162	94.5	+0.4
Two-party-preferred result
Labor	Kay Setches	15,360	52.1	+6.2
Liberal	Peter McArthur	14,133	47.9	−6.2
Labor gain from Liberal		Swing	+6.2	

=== Elections in the 1970s ===
1979 Victorian state election: Ringwood
Party	Candidate	Votes	%	±%
Liberal	Peter McArthur	13,364	47.8	−11.2
Labor	Robert Wallace	11,435	40.9	−0.1
Democrats	Max Capon	2,841	10.2	+10.2
Australia	Wilfid Thiele	332	1.2	+1.2
Total formal votes		27,972	97.6	+0.1
Informal votes		683	2.4	−0.1
Turnout		28,655	94.1	+0.9
Two-party-preferred result
Liberal	Peter McArthur	15,141	54.1	−4.9
Labor	Robert Wallace	12,831	45.9	+4.9
Liberal hold		Swing	−4.9	

1976 Victorian state election: Ringwood
Party	Candidate	Votes	%	±%
Liberal	Peter McArthur	15,288	59.0	+9.7
Labor	Robert Wallace	10,637	41.0	+1.4
Total formal votes		25,925	97.5	
Informal votes		673	2.5	
Turnout		26,598	93.2	
Liberal hold		Swing	+2.4	

1973 Victorian state election: Ringwood
Party	Candidate	Votes	%	±%
Liberal	Norman Lacy	18,965	51.0	+3.7
Labor	Peter Fuller	13,739	36.9	−4.7
Australia	Dulcie Bethune	2,649	7.1	+7.1
Democratic Labor	Antonio De Sousa	1,840	5.0	−6.2
Total formal votes		37,193	98.2	+0.4
Informal votes		687	1.8	−0.4
Turnout		37,880	93.0	−2.2
Two-party-preferred result
Liberal	Norman Lacy	21,589	58.1	+1.3
Labor	Peter Fuller	15,604	41.9	−1.3
Liberal hold		Swing	+1.3	

1970 Victorian state election: Ringwood
Party	Candidate	Votes	%	±%
Liberal	Jim Manson	13,848	47.3	−3.1
Labor	Beatrice Rosindell	12,166	41.6	+6.6
Democratic Labor	Edmund Sablovs	3,268	11.2	−3.4
Total formal votes		29,282	97.8	+0.2
Informal votes		666	2.2	−0.2
Turnout		29,948	95.2	+0.8
Two-party-preferred result
Liberal	Jim Manson	16,626	56.8	−6.0
Labor	Beatrice Rosindell	12,656	43.2	+6.0
Liberal hold		Swing	−6.0	

=== Elections in the 1960s ===
1967 Victorian state election: Ringwood
Party	Candidate	Votes	%	±%
Liberal	Jim Manson	12,374	50.3	−2.6
Labor	Norma Sweetman	8,614	35.0	+1.4
Democratic Labor	Graeme Madigan	3,586	14.6	+1.1
Total formal votes		24,574	97.6	
Informal votes		607	2.4	
Turnout		25,181	94.4	
Two-party-preferred result
Liberal	Jim Manson	15,421	62.8	−1.7
Labor	Norma Sweetman	9,153	37.2	+1.7
Liberal hold		Swing	−1.7	

1964 Victorian state election: Ringwood
Party	Candidate	Votes	%	±%
Liberal and Country	Jim Manson	19,350	50.3	+2.7
Labor	Graham Walsh	13,580	35.3	−1.7
Democratic Labor	Kevin Adamson	5,512	14.3	−1.1
Total formal votes		38,442	98.5	+0.1
Informal votes		576	1.5	−0.1
Turnout		39,018	95.2	−0.8
Two-party-preferred result
Liberal and Country	Jim Manson	24,136	62.5	+1.0
Labor	Graham Walsh	14,306	37.5	−1.0
Liberal and Country hold		Swing	+1.0	

1961 Victorian state election: Ringwood
Party	Candidate	Votes	%	±%
Liberal and Country	Jim Manson	15,882	47.6	−2.0
Labor	David Ould	12,346	37.0	−2.3
Democratic Labor	William Johnson	5,134	15.4	+4.3
Total formal votes		33,362	98.4	−0.3
Informal votes		548	1.6	+0.3
Turnout		33,910	96.0	+1.3
Two-party-preferred result
Liberal and Country	Jim Manson	20,530	61.5	+2.3
Labor	David Ould	12,832	38.5	−2.3
Liberal and Country hold		Swing	+2.3	

=== Elections in the 1950s ===
1958 Victorian state election: Ringwood
Party	Candidate	Votes	%	±%
Liberal and Country	Jim Manson	13,021	49.6	
Labor	William Webber	10,316	39.3	
Democratic Labor	Bruce Burne	2,917	11.1	
Total formal votes		26,244	98.7	
Informal votes		351	1.3	
Turnout		26,595	94.7	
Two-party-preferred result
Liberal and Country	Jim Manson	15,551	59.2	
Labor	William Webber	10,703	40.8	
Liberal and Country hold		Swing		
