= Post-election pendulum for the 2018 Victorian state election =

The Labor party won the 2018 state election by winning 55 of the 88 lower house seats. The coalition won 27 seats (Liberal 21 and Nationals 6) while the Greens and independents won 3 each.

Classification of seats as marginal, fairly safe or safe is applied by the independent Australian Electoral Commission using the following definition: "Where a winning party receives less than 56% of the vote, the seat is classified as 'marginal', 56–60% is classified as 'fairly safe' and more than 60% is considered 'safe'."

== Pendulum ==
The Mackerras pendulum was devised by the Australian psephologist Malcolm Mackerras as a way of predicting the outcome of an election contested between two major parties in a Westminster style lower house legislature such as the Australian House of Representatives, which is composed of single-member electorates and which uses a preferential voting system such as a Condorcet method or IRV.

The pendulum works by lining up all of the seats held in Parliament for the government, the opposition and the cross benches according to the percentage-point margin they are held by on a two party preferred basis. This is also known as the swing required for the seat to change hands. Given a uniform swing to the opposition or government parties, the number of seats that change hands can be predicted.

Labor seats - 2018
Seat	Member	Party	Margin
Marginal
Bayswater	Jackson Taylor	ALP	0.39%
Hawthorn	John Kennedy	ALP	0.42%
Nepean	Chris Brayne	ALP	0.91%
Northcote	Kat Theophanous	ALP	1.71% v GRN
Mount Waverley	Matt Fregon	ALP	1.85%
Box Hill	Paul Hamer	ALP	2.11%
Bass	Jordan Crugnale	ALP	2.39%
Ringwood	Dustin Halse	ALP	2.82%
Burwood	Will Fowles	ALP	3.31%
Melton	Steve McGhie	ALP	4.29%
South Barwon	Darren Cheeseman	ALP	4.60%
Richmond	Richard Wynne	ALP	5.46% v GRN
Fairly safe
Geelong	Christine Couzens	ALP	6.23% v IND
Narre Warren South	Gary Maas	ALP	6.90%
Pascoe Vale	Lizzie Blandthorn	ALP	8.58% v IND
Monbulk	James Merlino	ALP	8.60%
Werribee	Tim Pallas	ALP	8.78% v IND
Eltham	Vicki Ward	ALP	9.09%
Frankston	Paul Edbrooke	ALP	9.74%
Narre Warren North	Luke Donnellan	ALP	9.76%
Safe
Wendouree	Juliana Addison	ALP	10.26%
Cranbourne	Pauline Richards	ALP	10.98%
Bellarine	Lisa Neville	ALP	11.45%
Bentleigh	Nick Staikos	ALP	11.92%
Carrum	Sonya Kilkenny	ALP	11.95%
Bendigo East	Jacinta Allan	ALP	12.11%
Buninyong	Michaela Settle	ALP	12.24%
Ivanhoe	Anthony Carbines	ALP	12.36%
Niddrie	Ben Carroll	ALP	12.59%
Mulgrave	Daniel Andrews	ALP	12.71%
Mordialloc	Tim Richardson	ALP	12.90%
Albert Park	Martin Foley	ALP	13.13%
Macedon	Mary-Anne Thomas	ALP	13.18%
Sunbury	Josh Bull	ALP	14.33%
Altona	Jill Hennessy	ALP	14.57%
Keysborough	Martin Pakula	ALP	14.85%
Oakleigh	Steve Dimopoulos	ALP	15.78%
Essendon	Danny Pearson	ALP	15.86%
Yan Yean	Danielle Green	ALP	17.03%
Bundoora	Colin Brooks	ALP	17.42%
Clarinda	Meng Heang Tak	ALP	17.43%
Sydenham	Natalie Hutchins	ALP	17.86%
Tarneit	Sarah Connolly	ALP	18.02%
Bendigo West	Maree Edwards	ALP	18.55%
Lara	John Eren	ALP	19.14%
Very safe
Yuroke	Ros Spence	ALP	20.26%
Preston	Robin Scott	ALP	20.70% v GRN
St Albans	Natalie Suleyman	ALP	21.54%
Williamstown	Melissa Horne	ALP	22.07%
Dandenong	Gabrielle Williams	ALP	23.93%
Mill Park	Lily D'Ambrosio	ALP	24.9%
Kororoit	Marlene Kairouz	ALP	25.65%
Thomastown	Bronwyn Halfpenny	ALP	27.19%
Footscray	Katie Hall	ALP	28.11%
Broadmeadows	Frank McGuire	ALP	30.28%

Coalition seats - 2018
Seat	Member	Party	Margin
Marginal
Ripon	Louise Staley	LIB	0.02%
Caulfield	David Southwick	LIB	0.27%
Sandringham	Brad Rowswell	LIB	0.64%
Gembrook	Brad Battin	LIB	0.79%
Hastings	Neale Burgess	LIB	1.07%
Brighton	James Newbury	LIB	1.12%
Forest Hill	Neil Angus	LIB	1.16%
Ferntree Gully	Nick Wakeling	LIB	1.64%
Croydon	David Hodgett	LIB	2.12%
South-West Coast	Roma Britnell	LIB	2.31%
Eildon	Cindy McLeish	LIB	2.44%
Benambra	Bill Tilley	LIB	2.45% v IND
Evelyn	Bridget Vallence	LIB	2.65%
Warrandyte	Ryan Smith	LIB	3.88%
Kew	Tim Smith	LIB	4.78%
Mornington	David Morris	LIB	5.00%
Polwarth	Richard Riordan	LIB	5.40%
Rowville	Kim Wells	LIB	5.69%
Bulleen	Matthew Guy	LIB	5.77%
Fairly safe
Malvern	Michael O'Brien	LIB	6.1%
Narracan	Gary Blackwood	LIB	7.26%
Safe
Ovens Valley	Tim McCurdy	NAT	12.63%
Gippsland South	Danny O'Brien	NAT	15.33%
Euroa	Steph Ryan	NAT	15.44%
Gippsland East	Tim Bull	NAT	17.59%
Very safe
Lowan	Emma Kealy	NAT	23.48%
Murray Plains	Peter Walsh	NAT	23.95%
Crossbench seats - 2018
Mildura	Ali Cupper	IND	0.34% v NAT
Brunswick	Tim Read	GRN	0.57% v ALP
Melbourne	Ellen Sandell	GRN	1.32% v ALP
Morwell	Russell Northe	IND	1.84% v ALP
Shepparton	Suzanna Sheed	IND	5.3% v LIB
Prahran	Sam Hibbins	GRN	7.54% v LIB
