= Gordon Ashley =

Australian politician

Gordon Wetzel Ashley (born 15 September 1941) is a former Australian politician.

Born in Victoria, he received a Diploma of Theology from the Melbourne College of Divinity, and also a Bachelor of Arts from Melbourne University in 1973. In 1968, he became a migration officer in Melbourne, moving to the Australian Centre in Glasgow in 1969 and Australia House in London in 1972, before returning to Australia in 1973. In 1975, he became Publicity and Development Officer with the Productivity Promotion Council of Australia, but returned to London in 1978 to become Professions Adviser (Migration) with the Australian High Commission. In 1982, he returned to Australia as a self-employed personnel consultant. An active member of the Liberal Party, he unsuccessfully contested the seat of Aston in the 1987 federal election.

In 1992, he was elected to the Victorian Legislative Assembly as the member for the newly created seat of Bayswater. It had been created as a notional Labor seat, but Ashley claimed it for the Liberals as part of the massive Coalition landslide that year. He held the seat as a backbencher until 2002, when he was defeated by Labor's Peter Lockwood. He contested the Liberal preselection for the seat in 2006 and was initially endorsed, but his preselection was withdrawn by the party's administration committee in favour of photography business owner Heidi Victoria. Ashley ran instead as an independent and gained 9.2% of the vote; his preferences went towards ensuring Victoria's defeat of Lockwood.

Parliament of Victoria
Preceded by New seat	Member for Bayswater; 1992–2002	Succeeded by Peter Lockwood
