= Peter McArthur (politician) =

Australian politician

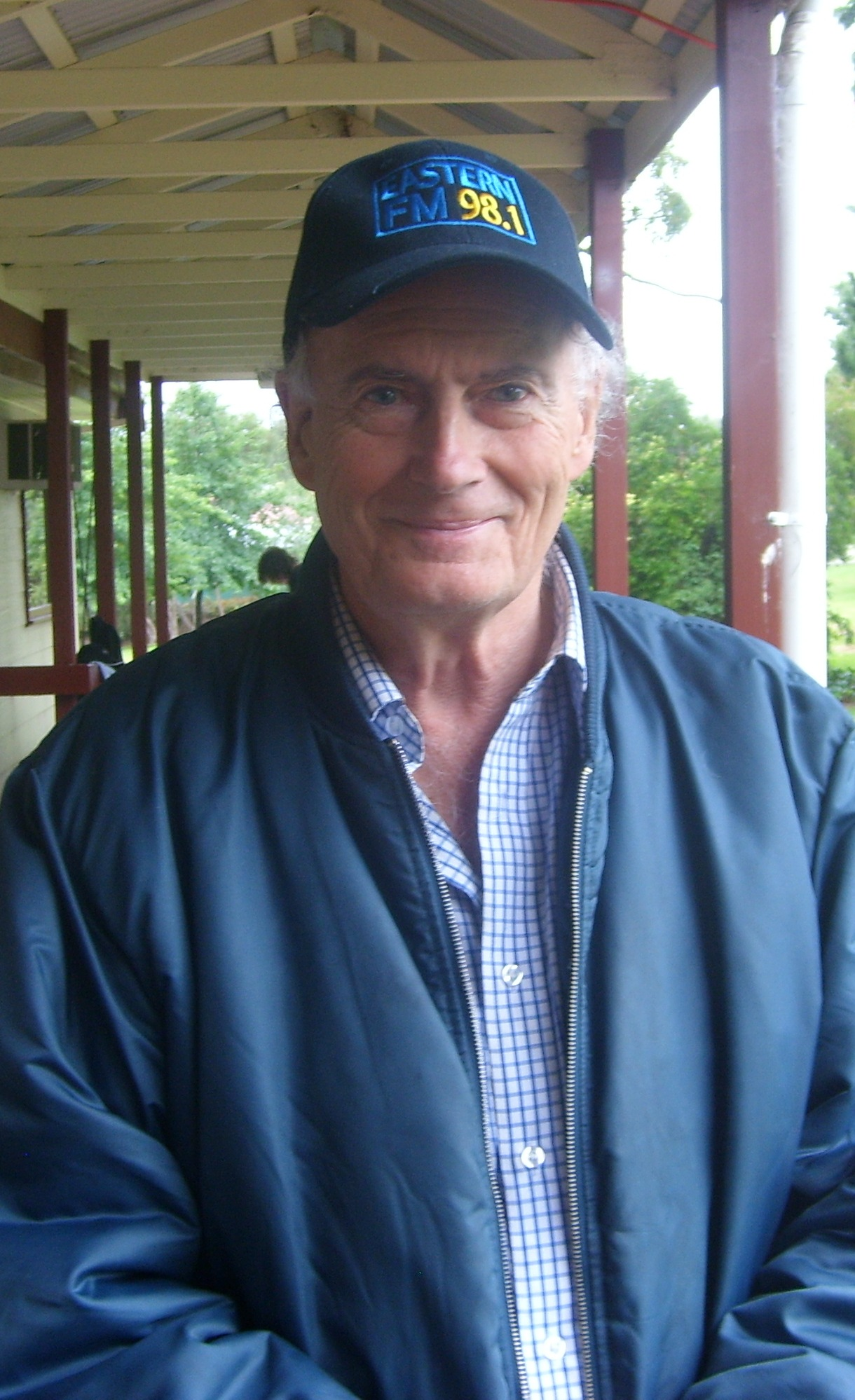
- McArthur at Radio Eastern 20th Birthday Celebrations, Melbourne, Australia 2009
- Born: 27 September 1937; Brighton, Victoria, Australia
- Died: 2 February 2017 (aged 79); Croydon, Victoria, Australia
- Occupations: Politician; ABC Newsreader; Radio Eastern FM Radio Announcer
- Children: 2

Peter Stewart McArthur (27 September 1937 – 2 February 2017) was an Australian politician and broadcaster. He worked for the ABC as broadcaster, and Channel 2 as a newsreader, weatherman and interviewer. At Radio 3LO, he was a weekend breakfast presenter and sports panelist. He co-founded 3ECB Radio Eastern 98.1 FM in 1991 and continued as a presenter and EFL Sports announcer with them till his death.

He was born in Brighton to woolclasser Stewart Campbell McArthur and Phyllis Marguerite Darling. He was educated at Haileybury College and also at Upwey, Albury and Camberwell. In 1960 he worked as a radio announcer in Ballarat, and after a stint overseas spent two years in Hobart. In 1964 he became a newsreader for the ABC, working in both television and radio. On 21 November 1966 he married Margaret Ann Yeoman; they had two children. From 1970 to 1976 he was a Councillor on Croydon City Council, serving as mayor from 1974 to 1975. In 1976 he was elected to the Victorian Legislative Assembly for Ringwood, representing the Liberal Party. He was the Chairman of the Victorian Parliamentary Road Safely Committee when the .05 legislation was introduced in Victoria.

Defeated in 1982, he returned to broadcasting with the ABC, working there until 2002. From 2005 to 2010 he was the president of Channel 31 Television in Melbourne.

From 1979-1982 he served as chairman of the Victorian Parliamentary All-Party Road Safety Committee.

In 1991, he co-founded Radio Eastern 98.1 FM Eastern Community Broadcasting (3ECB) station. Peter along with Herb Lilburn and Gerald Smart formed Radio Eastern in 1974 and the three worked for 16 years doing test broadcasts(directly from the base of the radio tower) and lobbying the government until a permanent license was granted in 1990. He also served as Secretary/Treasurer and Program Convener.

In 1994, before regular community television transmission occurred, McArthur became involved in ERA TV (Eastern Regional Access Television Inc.), one of the eight original founder groups of Channel 31 (Melbourne Community Television Consortium). He created in 1995 and was the Producer of a Television show called "Eastern Newsbeat" which aired 1078 shows on Channel 31 over 22 years.

He was also a Scottish Bagpiper.

He had been President at 3WBC and also President from 2005 to 2010 at Channel 31 Television in Melbourne.

McArthur had extensive family political connections: his grandfather Peter Campbell McArthur and great-uncle John Neil McArthur both represented Villiers and Heytesbury in the Assembly, while his uncle Stewart McArthur was the federal member for Corangamite from 1984 to 2007 and his cousin is Ted Baillieu.

Victorian Legislative Assembly
Preceded by Norman Lacy	Member for Ringwood; 1976–1982	Succeeded by Kay Setches
