= Peter Lockwood =

Australian politician

Peter John Lockwood is an Australian politician who currently serves as the councillor for Baird Ward on Knox City Council. He previously served as a member of the Victorian Legislative Assembly between 2002 and 2006, representing the electorate of Bayswater for the Labor Party.

== Political career ==
Lockwood was the successful candidate for Bayswater in the Victorian Legislative Assembly at the 2002 state election. He was a backbencher in the Bracks government until 2006, when he lost his seat to the Liberal Party.

=== Local government ===
Lockwood served on Knox City Council from 1993 to 1994. He again sought election as a councillor at the 2000 Victorian local elections, winning Dinsdale Ward. In 2012, he returned to local government and won Baird Ward .

He lost his seat in the 2020 local government elections but won again in 2024.

Victorian Legislative Assembly
Preceded by Gordon Ashley	Member for Bayswater; 2002–2006	Succeeded by Heidi Victoria
