= Kay Setches =

Australian politician

The Honourable Kay Setches AM

Member of the Victorian Legislative Assembly for Ringwood
- In office 3 April 1982 – 2 October 1992
- Preceded by: Peter McArthur
- Succeeded by: District abolished

Personal details
- Born: 28 November 1944 (age 81) Melbourne, Victoria, Australia
- Party: Labor Party

Kay Patricia Setches AM (born 28 November 1944) is an Australian politician. She was a Labor Party member of the Victorian Legislative Assembly from 1982 to 1992, representing the electorate of Ringwood. She was Minister for Conservation, Forests and Lands from 1988 to 1990, Minister for Community Services from 1990 to 1992 and Minister Responsible for Child Care from 1991 to 1992.

Setches was born in Melbourne, and was educated at St Joseph's Collingwood, Cromwell Street State School, and the Collingwood School of Domestic Arts. She resided in Croydon from 1964, and was a shop assistant before entering politics. She joined the Labor Party in 1972 and was involved in a number of community organisations, including serving as co-ordinator of the Maroondah Halfway House Group, a women's refuge, from 1977 to 1978 and president of the Boronia Technical School Council from 1979 to 1983. She was also an advocate for the rights of people with intellectual disabilities.

Setches was elected to the Legislative Assembly at the 1982 state election, defeating two-term Liberal MP Peter McArthur, and was re-elected in 1985 and 1988. She was promoted to the ministry in 1988 as Minister for Conservation, Forests and Lands, shifted to Minister for Community Services in 1990, and added the new portfolio of Minister Responsible for Child Care in 1991. Setches was minister during a period of significant change: she introduced mandatory reporting of child abuse, formally closed the notorious Sunbury Asylum however little was done to accommodate the insane who for the most part were left to roam the streets in places like St Kilda resulting in some being shot by police after turning violent, increased funding to Kew Cottages, and advocated the outlawing of surrogacy. Her seat of Ringwood was abolished for the 1992 election and she contested and lost the new notionally Labor seat of Bayswater as Labor were resoundingly defeated that year.

In retirement, she was one of the co-founders of EMILY's List Australia, and was a board member of the Victorian Women's Trust and the Queen Victoria Women's Centre Trust. She was one of the inaugural additions to the Victorian Honour Roll of Women in 2001. She subsequently retired to Victoria Harbour at Docklands, and has spoken about planning issues in the area.

Both of her children have been involved in Labor politics; her son, Earl Setches, is the secretary of the Plumbing Trades Employees Union, and her daughter, Vicki Setches, was the unsuccessful Labor candidate for Kilsyth at the 2010 state election. Three of her parliamentary advisers, Alan Griffin, Gavin Jennings and Lynne Kosky, subsequently went on to political careers of their own as federal and state ministers.

Political offices
Preceded by Joan Kirner	Minister for Conservation, Forests and Lands; 1988–1990	Succeeded by Steve Crabb as Minister for Conservation and Environment
Preceded by Peter Spyker	Minister for Community Services; 1990–1992	Succeeded by Marie Tehan
Parliament of Victoria
Preceded by Peter McArthur	Member for Ringwood; 1982–1992	Succeeded by Seat abolished
