= Dee Ryall =

Australian politician

Member of the Victorian Legislative Assembly for Ringwood
- In office 29 November 2014 – 24 November 2018
- Preceded by: New seat
- Succeeded by: Dustin Halse

Member of the Victorian Legislative Assembly for Mitcham
- In office 27 November 2010 – 29 November 2014
- Preceded by: Tony Robinson
- Succeeded by: Seat abolished

Personal details
- Born: 16 June 1967 (age 59) Box Hill, Victoria, Australia
- Party: Liberal Party

Deanne (Dee) Sharon Ryall (born 16 June 1967) is an Australian politician. She was a member of the Victorian Legislative Assembly representing the electorate of Mitcham for the Liberal Party from 2010 to 2014 and Ringwood from 2014 to 2018.

== Personal life ==
Ryall grew up in Blackburn North, Victoria, where she attended and gained her Higher School Certificate from Blackburn High School. Ryall completed her Certificate of Nursing at The Alfred Hospital in 1988 and in 1991 completed a Bachelor of Nursing from La Trobe University.

She was involved in business for 15 years as a specialist in management systems.

== Political career ==
Ryall contested the 2010 Victorian State election in the marginal electorate of Mitcham in metropolitan Melbourne, representing the Liberal Party, winning 52.90% of the vote after preferences had been distributed. Mitcham had been held by Brumby Government Minister Tony Robinson on a margin of 2%.

Victorian Legislative Assembly
Preceded by Tony Robinson	Member for Mitcham; 2010–2014	Abolished
New seat	Member for Ringwood; 2014–2018	Succeeded by Dustin Halse
