= Will Fowles =

Australian politician (born 1978)

Will Fowles MP
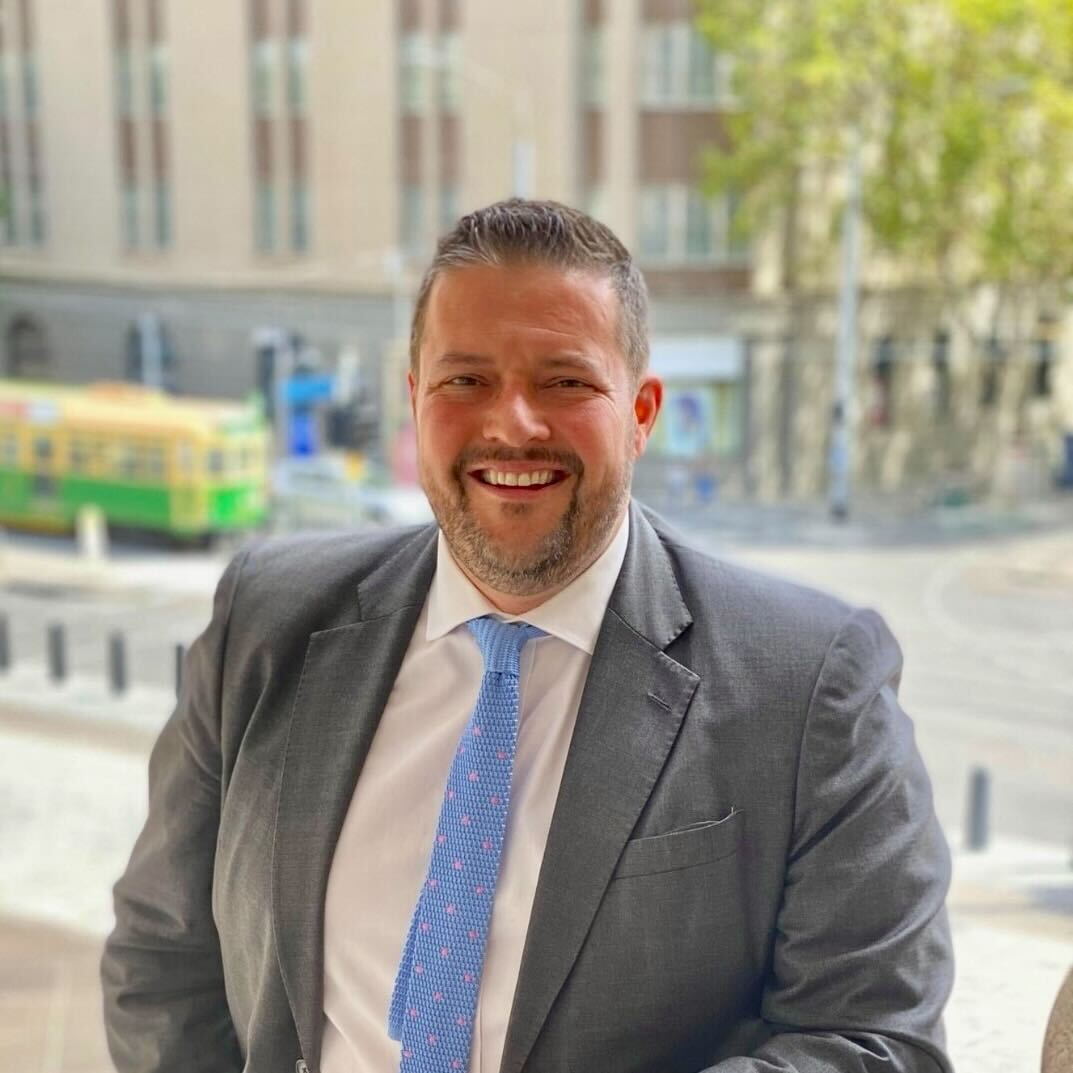
- Fowles in February 2021

Member of the Victorian Legislative Assembly for Ringwood
- Incumbent
- Assumed office 26 November 2022
- Preceded by: Dustin Halse

Member of the Victorian Legislative Assembly for Burwood
- In office 24 November 2018 – 26 November 2022
- Preceded by: Graham Watt
- Succeeded by: Seat abolished

Personal details
- Born: William David Fowles; 27 July 1978 (age 48) Fitzroy, Victoria, Australia
- Party: Independent (since 2024)
- Other political affiliations: Labor (1999−2024)
- Children: 4
- Education: Monash University
- Committees: Legislative Assembly Environment and Planning Committee
- Website: www.willfowles.com.au

William David Fowles (born 27 July 1978) is an Australian politician in the Victorian Legislative Assembly, representing the division of Ringwood.

Fowles was first elected in November 2018, initially representing the seat of Burwood in Melbourne's eastern suburbs for the Victorian Labor Party. Ahead of the 2022 Victorian state election, the seat of Burwood was abolished by Victoria's Electoral Boundaries Commission, leading Fowles to stand for the seat of Ringwood. He was elected as the Member for Ringwood in November 2022. After allegations of sexual assault of a government employee were published, Fowles resigned from the Labor caucus in August 2023 before resigning as a Labor member in August 2024. He has since sat as an independent.

== Early life and education ==
Fowles grew up in the eastern suburbs of Melbourne. He has three brothers. His father is David Fowles, the chief executive and part owner of Fowles Auction Group. His brother is Matt Fowles, chief executive and owner of Fowles Wines. His brother Jack Fowles leads Fowles Entertainment, is the Manager of Major Giving at Arts Centre Melbourne, and is an Honorary Aide to the Governor of Victoria.

Fowles attended Scotch College and Monash University. In 2000, he was elected President of the Monash University Students' Association.

== Pre-parliamentary career ==
Fowles worked as a strategic communications consultant before running for Parliament. He has run a hospitality and property investment business, and a fund management business.

Fowles has also served on key sporting boards and committees. In 2005, he became the youngest ever member of the MCC Committee, ultimately being re-elected twice and serving nine years in that role. Additionally, he was appointed as a Trustee of the Melbourne and Olympic Parks Trust in 2015, where he served until 2018.

== Political career ==
In 2002 Fowles stood as a candidate in the East Yarra by-election gaining an 8.8% swing to Labor, but failing narrowly to defeat Liberal MP Richard Dalla-Riva. In 2008, Fowles ran for Lord Mayor of Melbourne and was defeated by Robert Doyle.

=== Member for Burwood ===
At the 2018 Victorian state election, Fowles stood as the Labor candidate for the seat of Burwood, in Melbourne's east, challenging incumbent Liberal MP Graham Watt. Fowles secured 53.3% of the two-party preferred result thanks to a strong 6.47% swing towards Labor, unseating Graham Watt and becoming only the second Labor MP to hold the traditionally Liberal seat once held by former Premier Jeff Kennett. Fowles was sworn into office on 29 November 2018.

Fowles was appointed to the Legislative Assembly Environment and Planning Committee on 21 March 2019. Since then, the committee has held inquiries into climate change action, environmental infrastructure and apartment design standards.

On 25 July 2019, Fowles was questioned by ACT Police in Canberra following an incident in which he had kicked in the door of a hotel room at the Abode Apartments in Kingston. Fowles was not charged with any offence and apologised for his actions, saying that he had been suffering from addiction and other mental health issues and had been attempting to retrieve medication from his luggage which was locked in the room. Fowles took a leave of absence to address his health issues and returned later in the year as an advocate for the government's investment in mental health as recommended by the Mental Health Royal Commission.

=== Member for Ringwood ===
In October 2021, the Victorian Electoral Boundaries Commission released the Report on the Redivision of Victorian Electoral Boundaries 2020–2021, confirming that Fowles' seat of Burwood was to be abolished, and split between the existing seat of Box Hill and the new seat of Ashwood. This abolition resulted in Fowles standing for Ringwood electorate at the 2022 Victorian State Election, following the decision of incumbent Dustin Halse MP not to recontest. Fowles subsequently moved to Ringwood with his wife and their child, and won re-election at the 2022 Victorian state election with a 3% drop in first preference, but a 4.3% two party preferred swing in his favour.

On 5 August 2023, Fowles resigned from the parliamentary Labor Party at the request of then-Premier Daniel Andrews following allegations of sexual assault of a government employee. In January 2024, police announced the completion of their investigation and did not pursue criminal charges. Jacinta Allan, who had since replaced Andrews as premier, declared that Fowles would not return to the Labor caucus. Fowles formally resigned as a Labor member in August 2024. Fowles stated in a September 2025 parliamentary speech that he was considering a candidacy for the Legislative Council. Fowles is retiring from politics at the 2026 state election.

=== Candidacy for Preston ===
Fowles has nominated for the state seat of Preston in the Victorian 2026 election. Fowles has admitted that he has no chance of winning the seat.

=== Policy positions ===
In his inaugural speech to Parliament following his election, Fowles spoke about the importance of addressing economic inequality and called for greater fairness in society. In particular, Fowles spoke about the need for more social housing, and the improved social mobility that stems from this. In his speech, he expressed his support for the labour movement and the goal of an Australian Republic. In parliament, Fowles has spoken in favour of strong action on climate change, improved healthcare services, LGBTIQ+ rights, women's rights and investment in education and social housing.

== Personal life ==
Fowles married Fiona Clemens, when he was 24 years old. He met Clemens in high school, and attended university with her. Fowles and Clemens have a daughter named Molly. After his marriage to Clemens, Fowles married Jessica Fox.

Fowles is a strong advocate for mental health reform. Fowles has openly discussed his struggles with depression and anxiety, which he was diagnosed with in 2006. "My focus is on ... working hard on my mental health and being a better rep". He has since been a strong supporter of Victoria's Royal Commission into Mental Health, speaking in Parliament about his experiences with the mental health system after the final report was handed down in 2021.

Fowles is a supporter of the Melbourne Demons and has been a member since 1996.

Parliament of Victoria
Preceded by Graham Watt	Member for Burwood; 2018–present	Incumbent
