= Electoral district of Bayswater =

State electoral district of Victoria, Australia

Bayswater Victoria—Legislative Assembly
- Interactive map of electoral district boundaries from the 2022 state election
- State: Victoria
- Created: 1992
- MP: Jackson Taylor
- Party: Labor
- Namesake: Suburb of Bayswater
- Electors: 49,707 (2022)
- Area: 39 km^{2} (15.1 sq mi)
- Demographic: Metropolitan
- Coordinates: 37°50′S 145°16′E
Electorates around Bayswater:
Ringwood	Ringwood	Croydon
Glen Waverley	Bayswater	Monbulk
Rowville	Rowville	Monbulk

The electoral district of Bayswater is one of the electoral districts of Victoria, Australia, for the Victorian Legislative Assembly. It covers an area of 39 square kilometres (15 sq mi) in outer eastern Melbourne, and includes the suburbs of Bayswater, Heathmont, Kilsyth South and The Basin, and parts of Bayswater North, Boronia, Ringwood and Wantirna. It lies within the Eastern Metropolitan Region of the upper house, the Legislative Council.

Bayswater was created as a notionally marginal Labor seat in a redistribution for the 1992 state election. It replaced the abolished electorate of Ringwood, which had been held by Labor MP and Kirner government Minister for Community Services Kay Setches since 1982. The area had been traditionally Liberal prior to Setches' election; she had been the first Labor member to hold Ringwood. Setches contested Bayswater at the election, but was resoundingly defeated by Liberal candidate and personnel consultant Gordon Ashley in the Liberal landslide victory that year, one of several ministers to lose their seats.

Ashley was easily re-elected at the 1996 election and 1999 election, but was unexpectedly defeated by Labor candidate Peter Lockwood in the Labor landslide victory at the 2002 election. Lockwood only lasted one term before being defeated by Liberal Heidi Victoria in 2006. Victoria served as Minister for the Arts, Minister for Women's Affairs and Minister for Consumer Affairs in the Napthine Ministry from 2013 to 2014. The seat was won back by Labor somewhat unexpectedly in the 2018 Victorian state election, with Jackson Taylor serving as the current Labor MP for the district.

== Members for Bayswater ==
Member	Party	Term
Gordon Ashley	Liberal	1992–2002
Peter Lockwood	Labor	2002–2006
Heidi Victoria	Liberal	2006–2018
Jackson Taylor	Labor	2018–2026

== Election results ==
2022 Victorian state election: Bayswater
Party	Candidate	Votes	%	±%
Labor	Jackson Taylor	17,609	41.3	+0.5
Liberal	Nick Wakeling	15,174	35.6	−12.1
Greens	Nadia Sirninger Rankin	3,151	7.4	−1.4
Legalise Cannabis	Ashley Heap	1,653	3.9	+3.9
Family First	Gary Coombes	1,397	3.3	+3.3
Democratic Labour	Thomas Dolan	948	2.2	+2.2
Freedom	Chris Field	937	2.2	+2.2
Independent	Chloe Mackallah	890	2.1	+2.1
Animal Justice	Alyssa Wormald	840	2.0	−0.6
Total formal votes		42,599	94.4	+0.0
Informal votes		2,512	5.6	−0.0
Turnout		45,111	90.8	−0.4
Two-party-preferred result
Labor	Jackson Taylor	23,101	54.2	+4.8
Liberal	Nick Wakeling	19,498	45.8	−4.8
Labor notional gain from Liberal		Swing	+4.8	

=== Graphical summary ===
Two-party-preferred vote results in Bayswater View source data.
