= Dustin Halse =

Australian politician

Dr Dustin Halse MP

Member of the Victorian Legislative Assembly for Ringwood
- In office 24 November 2018 – 26 November 2022
- Preceded by: Dee Ryall
- Succeeded by: Will Fowles

Personal details
- Born: 3 May 1985 (age 41)
- Party: Labor Party
- Spouse: Rachel Halse
- Education: PhD Swinburne University of Technology
- Occupation: Academic, trade union official
- Website: www.dustinhalsemp.com.au

Dustin Raffaele Halse (born 3 May 1985) is a former Australian politician. He was a Labor Party member of the Victorian Legislative Assembly from November 2018 to November 2022, representing the seat of Ringwood. On 24 November 2021, Halse shared publicly that he would not be recontesting his seat in the 2022 Victorian state election.

== Early life/education ==
Halse was born in the eastern suburbs of Melbourne on 3 May 1985. He completed high school at Trinity College, Perth, before later being educated at Monash University, from which he graduated with a Bachelor of Arts and Master of International Development and Environmental Analysis. He was awarded a PhD from Swinburne University of Technology in political and labour history in 2015. He wrote his doctoral thesis on the history of Victorian public service unionism, titled, 'From Servants to Citizens'. In 2013, Halse was awarded the inaugural Sam Merrifield prize by the Melbourne Branch of the Labour History Society for his article, 'Citizens who Serve'.

Before entering politics, he worked in retail and hospitality, aged care, as a university lecturer and fellow, and a trade union official for both the National Tertiary Education Union and the Health Services Union.

== Political career ==
Halse was preselected for the seat Victorian State District of Ringwood in August 2018, following the withdrawal of former Labor candidate Steve Kent. At the November 2018 election, Halse defeated incumbent Liberal MP, Dee Ryall, with a swing of 7.9% to the Labor Party.

During his first term, Halse advocated for significant reform to Victoria's mental health system, publicly writing about mental ill-health and the need for people to reach out for support: ‘By confronting the culture of silence that surrounds mental illness, we can confront the stigma that so often allows it to prevail’.

In 2019, Halse was appointed Chair of the Wage Theft Community Consultations by then Attorney-General Jill Hennessy, which led to the introduction of Australia's first wage theft laws. As a trade unionist, Halse has continually argued for a strengthening of Victoria's industrial and workplace safety laws publicly and in parliamentary debate.

Halse has also written and spoken extensively on homelessness and housing economics, arguing in the Victorian Legislative Assembly that ‘building more social housing can and will make a real difference in the lives of some of the most vulnerable people in our community’ and that a 'Housing First' approach is required to address fundamental inequity in the market.

On gambling reform, Halse argued that more needs to be done to address problem gambling, remarking in the Victorian Legislative Assembly that the ‘pokie machine industry seeks to exploit often the most acute vulnerabilities of people at their lowest ebb’.

On LGBTIQ rights, Halse argued in favour of banning gay conversion therapy, advocated for birth certificate reform, and called for greater support for PRIDE and LGBTIQ services.

Halse also called for stronger action to mitigate and address Climate Change, and supported the School Strikes for Climate Change movement.

On a number of matters, Halse voiced opinion against government policy. He called for an end to duck shooting in Victoria, and argued against the incarceration of children under the age of 14 as a part of the Raise the Age campaign.

In June 2021, James Newbury MP used the protection of parliamentary privilege to accuse Halse of having a relationship in his parliamentary office. There was no suggestion that Halse's relationship was non-consensual. Reason Party MP Fiona Patten stated Newbury's actions had "dropped to a new low"

On 24 November 2021, Halse announced that he had chosen not to accept the Labor Party's invitation to stand for office again at the 2022 Victorian State Election. Premier Daniel Andrews thanked Halse in a public statement: ‘Over the last three years, Dustin has been a passionate and committed representative and advocate for his local community – however, his commitment to improving opportunities for working people is long standing. Driving fairer outcomes for his constituents has been at the centre of his time as a Labor member of parliament’.

In July 2022, Halse was elected Chair of the Integrity and Oversight Committee, replacing Harriet Shing, and subsequently Chair of the Integrity and Oversight Audit Sub-Committee.

On 26 November 2022, Will Fowles was elected the Member for Ringwood, replacing Halse and retaining the seat for the Labor Party.

== Personal life ==
Halse is married with one child, and remains a resident of the eastern suburbs.

Parliament of Victoria
Preceded by Dee Ryall	Member for Ringwood; 2018–present	Incumbent
