= Heidi Victoria =

Photographer. Former Australian politician

The Honourable Heidi Victoria

Member of the Victorian Legislative Assembly for Bayswater
- In office 25 November 2006 – 24 November 2018
- Preceded by: Peter Lockwood
- Succeeded by: Jackson Taylor

Personal details
- Born: Heidi Mitterlehner; 12 October 1967 (age 59) Melbourne, Victoria, Australia
- Party: Liberal Party
- Education: Phillip Institute of Technology
- Occupation: Photographer
- Website: heidivictoria.com.au

Heidi Victoria (born Heidi Mitterlehner on 12 October 1967) is a professional photographer and former Australian politician. She was a member of the Victorian Legislative Assembly, representing Bayswater for the Liberal Party from 2006 to 2018.

== Early life ==
Victoria was born in Melbourne to an Austrian father and a New Zealand mother. She completed her HSC in 1984, and went on to complete her BA in Fine Art Photography in 1988 at the Phillip Institute of Technology (now part of RMIT University). Prior to her election, Victoria owned and operated her own photography business, specialising in portraits and event photography.

== Political career ==
Within the Liberal Party, Victoria has served as branch president, vice-president and secretary; state and federal electorate council delegate; fundraiser; branch development officer; and State council and Federal conference delegate. She was elected to the seat of Bayswater at the November 2006 election. In November 2009, she was named Shadow Parliamentary Secretary for Arts, following her strong involvement in the campaign to prevent the proposed changes to the Victorian College of the Arts.

After Ted Baillieu resigned as Premier in March 2013, Victoria was given the ministerial portfolios of Arts, Women's Affairs and Consumer Affairs within the Denis Napthine cabinet.

== Controversies ==
In July 2009, Victoria was asked to apologise for using unparliamentary language during a late night parliamentary debate.

In early November 2014, multiple election campaign signs for Heidi Victoria were defaced with swastikas and offensive language throughout the Heathmont and Bayswater area. Victoria was quoted saying "The other reason this is really disappointing is that we pride ourselves in Australia as being a free country and democratic society"

Victorian Legislative Assembly
Preceded by Peter Lockwood	Member for Bayswater; 2006–2018	Succeeded by Jackson Taylor
Political offices
Preceded by Denis Napthine	Minister for the Arts; 2013–2014	Succeeded by Martin Pakula as Minister for Creative Industries
Preceded by Michael O'Brien	Minister for Consumer Affairs; 2013–2014	Succeeded by Jane Garrett
Preceded by Mary Wooldridge	Minister for Women's Affairs; 2013–2014	Succeeded by Fiona Richardson as Minister for Women
