= Electoral district of Ringwood (Victoria) =

State electoral district of Victoria, Australia

Coordinates: 37.811°S 145.231°E

Ringwood Victoria—Legislative Assembly
- Interactive map of electoral district boundaries from the 2022 state election
- State: Victoria
- Dates current: 1958–1992; 2014–present
- MP: Will Fowles
- Party: Independent
- Namesake: Suburb of Ringwood
- Electors: 41,299 (2018)
- Area: 35 km^{2} (13.5 sq mi)
- Demographic: Metropolitan
Electorates around Ringwood:
Box Hill	Warrandyte	Croydon
Box Hill	Ringwood	Croydon
Glen Waverley	Glen Waverley	Bayswater

The electoral district of Ringwood is an electoral district of the Victorian Legislative Assembly, located in the east of Melbourne. It was first proclaimed in 1958 and was abolished in 1992. Some of Ringwood was included in the new electoral district of Bayswater that year. Kay Setches, who was at the time the last member for Ringwood, contested and lost Bayswater at the 1992 election.

The electorate was created again in the 2013 redistribution of electoral boundaries that took effect at the 2014 state election. The new district largely replaces the abolished district of Mitcham, covering suburbs along the eastern parts of the Maroondah Highway. The abolished district of Mitcham was held by Liberal MP Dee Ryall, who lost the seat in a big swing against her in 2018.

As of the 2022 Victorian state election, the seat contains the suburbs of Heathmont, Mitcham, Nunawading, Ringwood East, most of Ringwood, parts of Blackburn, Blackburn North, Donvale, Forest Hill, and Vermont in the local government areas of Maroondah City and Whitehorse City. The district's boundaries were also adjusted to account for local population changes. Ringwood North was transferred to Warrandyte, while parts of Blackburn, Forest Hill, Vermont, and Heathmont were absorbed into the seat.

== Members ==
First incarnation (1958–1992)
Member	Party	Term
Jim Manson	Liberal	1958–1973
Norman Lacy	Liberal	1973–1976
Peter McArthur	Liberal	1976–1982
Kay Setches	Labor	1982–1992
Second incarnation (2014–present)
Member	Party	Term
Dee Ryall	Liberal	2014–2018
Dustin Halse	Labor	2018–2022
Will Fowles	Labor	2022–2023
Will Fowles	Independent Labor	2023–2024
Will Fowles	Independent	2024–present

== Election results ==
2022 Victorian state election: Ringwood
Party	Candidate	Votes	%	±%
Labor	Will Fowles	17,851	39.0	−3.3
Liberal	Cynthia Watson	15,467	33.8	−9.9
Greens	Reuben Steen	7,105	15.5	+2.1
Democratic Labour	Gary Ryan	1,684	3.7	+3.7
Family First	Richard Griffith-Jones	1,396	3.1	+3.1
Animal Justice	Nick Rowe	1,212	2.6	+2.2
Freedom	Robyn M. Siemer	1,038	2.3	+2.3
Total formal votes		45,753	96.5	+1.7
Informal votes		1,676	3.5	−1.7
Turnout		47,429	91.1	−0.2
Two-party-preferred result
Labor	Will Fowles	26,322	57.5	+4.3
Liberal	Cynthia Watson	19,431	42.5	−4.3
Labor hold		Swing	+4.3	

Two-party-preferred vote results in Ringwood View source data.
