= Jackson Taylor =

Australian politician

Jackson Taylor MP
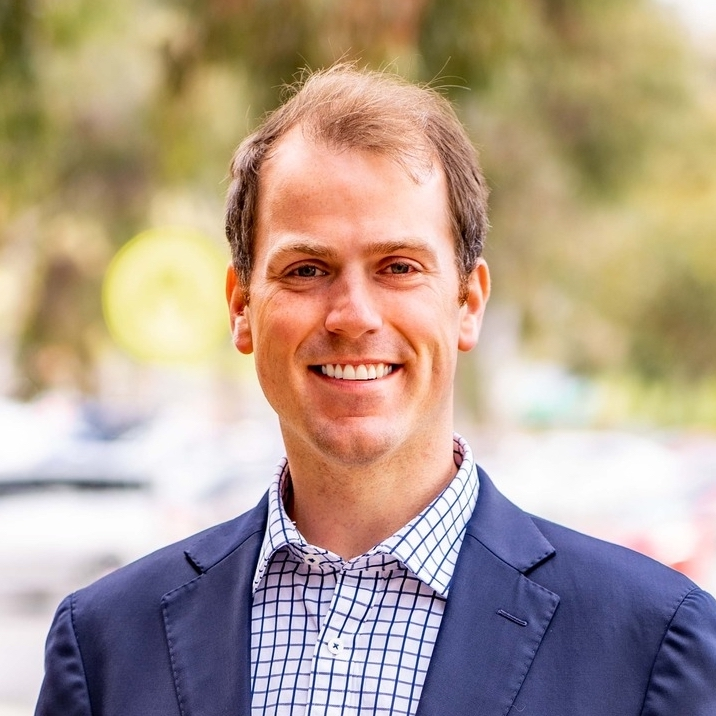
- Taylor in 2022

Member of the Victorian Legislative Assembly for Bayswater
- Incumbent
- Assumed office 24 November 2018
- Preceded by: Heidi Victoria

Deputy Mayor of Knox City Council
- In office 2018 – 6 December 2018

Member of the Knox City Council
- In office 6 December 2016 – 6 December 2018
- Preceded by: Joe Cossari
- Succeeded by: Marcia Timmers-Leitch
- Constituency: Collier Ward

Personal details
- Born: 1991 or 1992 (age 33–34)
- Party: Labor
- Education: Dandenong Primary School; Dandenong High School
- Website: www.jacksontaylor.com.au

Jackson George Taylor (born 1991/1992) is an Australian politician and former local government councillor. He has been a Labor Party member of the Victorian Legislative Assembly since November 2018, representing the electorate of Bayswater.

Taylor worked as a police officer before entering politics, and served as deputy mayor of Knox City Council.

== Career ==
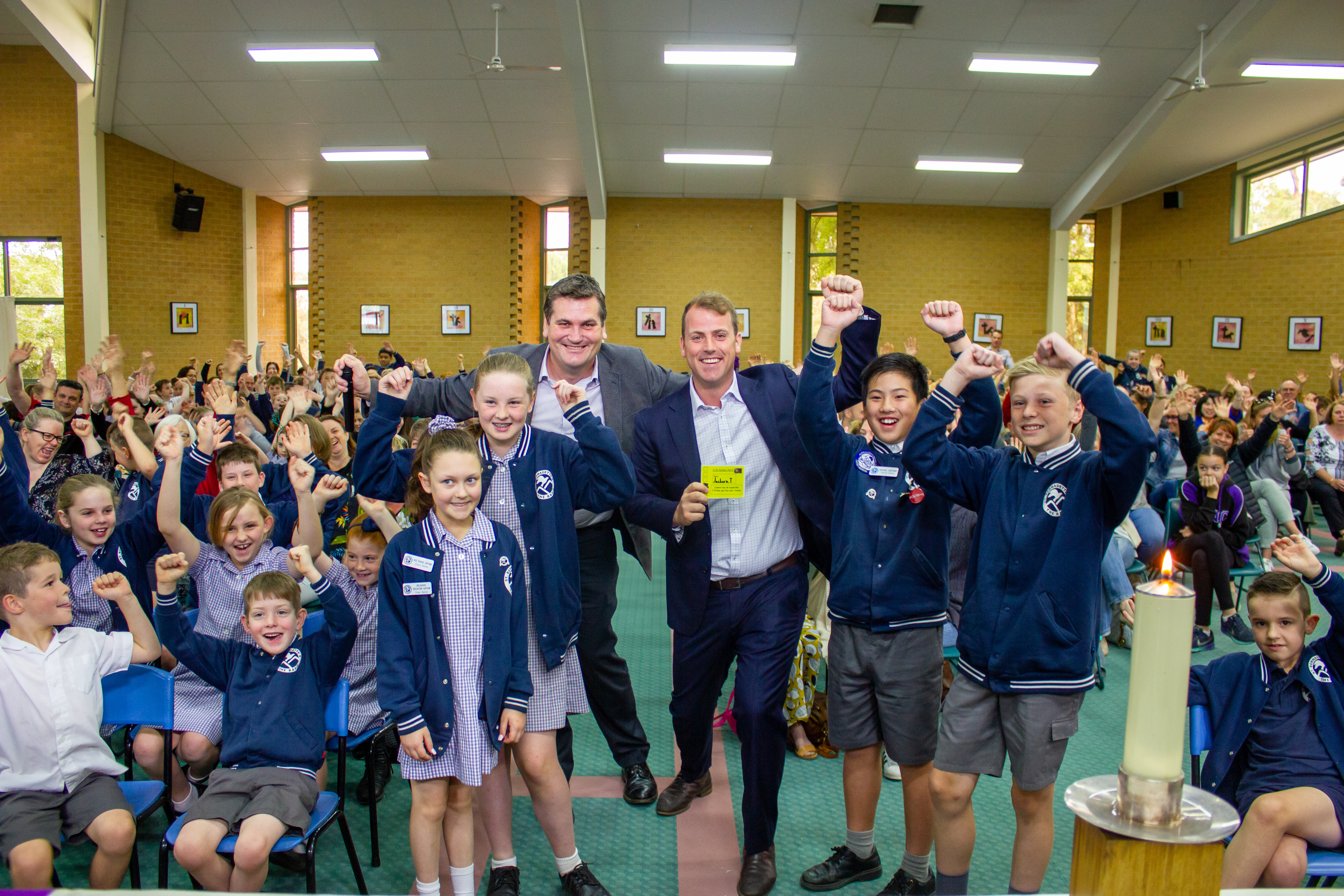
Jackson Taylor at St Bernadette's Primary School, The Basin

In 2016, Taylor was elected to Knox City Council in Collier Ward, with a margin of 5.85%. In 2018, he became the deputy mayor of the council. For five years, Taylor was a serving member of Victoria Police, stationed at Glen Waverley and Lilydale, as well as spending time in the Family Violence Unit. When he was pre-selected by the Labor Party to run for state parliament, he was serving as a police prosecutor, with the rank of senior constable.

At the age of 26, Taylor won his seat at the 2018 state election, with a margin of just 0.4%. He had been preselected by the Victorian Labor Party less than a month out from polling. Over the second term of the Andrews Labor Government, Taylor ran a successful campaign to fund a full rebuild of the CFA fire station at The Basin, and secured funding for projects in many schools in the electorate, including the Bayswater Education Plan, which encompassed several schools.

In his inaugural speech, Taylor detailed experiences in his childhood around witnessing family violence, substance abuse and his mother's mental health battles, as well as his time in out of home care. Taylor discussed how the power of education and support from teachers provided "direction" and "purpose" during his early life.

Taylor is a member two committees in state parliament - the Integrity and Oversight Committee and Legal and Social Issues Committee.

He was re-elected at the 2022 Victorian state election, overcoming a boundary redistribution that made the seat of Bayswater notionally Liberal-held to defeat Nick Wakeling with a nearly five percent swing in his favour.

Originally a member of Labor Right, Taylor defected to Labor Left along with six of his colleagues shortly after the 2022 Victorian state election. The defection of he and his colleagues meant that the Labor Left constituted a majority of the state Labor caucus.

On 23 September 2025, Taylor announced that he would not run for a third term and would instead retire from politics at the 2026 election, citing the need to spend more time with his young family.

Parliament of Victoria
Preceded by Heidi Victoria	Member for Bayswater; 2018–present	Incumbent
