= Electoral results for the district of Toorak =

Victoria, Australia, district election results

This is a list of electoral results for the electoral district of Toorak in Victorian state elections.

== Members for Toorak ==
Member	Party	Term
(Sir) Matthew Davies		1889–1892
Alexander McKinley		1892–1894
Robert Dyce Reid		1894–1897
Duncan Gillies	Conservative–Liberal Coalition	1897–1903
George Fairbairn	Non-Labor	1903–1906
Norman Bayles	Ministerialist; Independent; Liberal; Nationalist; Economy Party	1906–1920
(Sir) Stanley Argyle	Nationalist	1920–1931
(Sir) Stanley Argyle	United Australia	1931–1940
Harold Thonemann	United Australia	1941–1945
Robert Bell Hamilton	Liberal	1945–1948
Edward Reynolds	Liberal / LCP	1948–1952
Horace Petty	Liberal and Country (LCP)	1952–1964
Philip Hudson	LCP / Liberal	1964–1967

== Election results ==
=== Elections in the 1960s ===
==== 1964 ====
1964 Victorian state election: Toorak
Party	Candidate	Votes	%	±%
Liberal and Country	Philip Hudson	10,112	60.8	−12.9
Labor	George Gahan	5,060	30.5	+30.5
Democratic Labor	Rita McGuiness	1,447	8.7	−17.6
Total formal votes		16,619	97.6	+6.6
Informal votes		402	2.4	−6.6
Turnout		17,021	90.0	+0.2
Two-party-preferred result
Liberal and Country	Philip Hudson	11,341	68.3	−5.4
Labor	George Gahan	5,278	31.7	+31.7
Liberal and Country hold		Swing	+7.8	

==== 1961 ====
1961 Victorian state election: Toorak
Party	Candidate	Votes	%	±%
Liberal and Country	Horace Petty	11,356	73.7	+12.2
Democratic Labor	John Speed	4,054	26.3	+26.3
Total formal votes		15,410	91.0	−7.0
Informal votes		1,428	9.0	+7.0
Turnout		16,838	89.8	−1.2
Liberal and Country hold		Swing	N/A	

=== Elections in the 1950s ===
==== 1958 ====
1958 Victorian state election: Toorak
Party	Candidate	Votes	%	±%
Liberal and Country	Horace Petty	10,664	61.5	
Labor	George Gahan	6,682	38.5	
Total formal votes		17,346	98.0	
Informal votes		399	2.1	
Turnout		18,807	95.3	
Liberal and Country hold		Swing		

==== 1955 ====
1955 Victorian state election: Toorak
Party	Candidate	Votes	%	±%
Liberal and Country	Horace Petty	10,408	64.2	
Independent Labor	George Gahan	3,578	22.1	
Victorian Liberal	Geoffrey Kiddle	2,225	13.7	
Total formal votes		16,211	95.9	
Informal votes		698	4.1	
Turnout		16,909	91.4	
Two-candidate-preferred result
Liberal and Country	Horace Petty	12,077	74.5	
Independent Labor	George Gahan	4,134	25.5	
Liberal and Country hold		Swing		

==== 1952 ====
1952 Victorian state election: Toorak
Party	Candidate	Votes	%	±%
Labor	Henry Peagram	8,925	43.7	+1.4
Liberal and Country	Horace Petty	7,424	36.4	−21.3
Electoral Reform	Mabel Brookes	4,068	19.9	+19.9
Total formal votes		20,417	98.3	−0.9
Informal votes		343	1.7	+0.9
Turnout		20,760	90.7	−4.8
Two-party-preferred result
Liberal and Country	Horace Petty	10,425	51.1	−6.6
Labor	Henry Peagram	9,992	48.9	+6.6
Liberal and Country hold		Swing	−6.6	

==== 1952 by-election ====
1952 Toorak state by-election
Party	Candidate	Votes	%	±%
Liberal and Country	Horace Petty	9,160	50.8	−6.9
Labor	Henry Peagram	8,874	49.2	+6.9
Total formal votes		18,034	99.0	−0.2
Informal votes		176	1.0	+0.2
Turnout		18,210	76.7	−18.8
Liberal and Country hold		Swing	−6.9	

==== 1950 ====
1950 Victorian state election: Toorak
Party	Candidate	Votes	%	±%
Liberal and Country	Edward Reynolds	12,509	57.7	−1.3
Labor	Henry Peagram	9,178	42.3	+42.3
Total formal votes		21,687	99.2	+2.1
Informal votes		176	0.8	−2.1
Turnout		21,863	95.5	+7.6
Liberal and Country hold		Swing	N/A	

=== Elections in the 1940s ===
==== 1948 ====
1948 Toorak state by-election
Party	Candidate	Votes	%	±%
Liberal	Edward Reynolds	11,725	60.8	+1.8
Labor	Bill Bourke	7,562	39.2	+39.2
Total formal votes		19,278	99.1	+2.0
Informal votes		182	0.9	−2.0
Turnout		19,469	73.6	−14.3
Liberal hold		Swing	N/A	

==== 1947 ====
1947 Victorian state election: Toorak
Party	Candidate	Votes	%	±%
Liberal	Robert Hamilton	13,178	59.0	+37.5
Independent	Peter Ryan	6,613	29.6	+29.6
Independent Liberal	Edgar Morton	2,542	11.4	+11.4
Total formal votes		22,333	97.1	+3.3
Informal votes		666	2.9	−3.3
Turnout		22,999	87.9	+5.3
Liberal hold		Swing	N/A	

- Preferences were not distributed.

==== 1945 ====
1945 Victorian state election: Toorak
Party	Candidate	Votes	%	±%
Liberal	Harold Thonemann	5,627	28.3	
Independent Labor	John Smith	4,518	22.8	
Independent Liberal	Robert Hamilton	4,278	21.5	
Independent Labor	Albert Nicholls	3,316	16.7	
Independent Liberal	Charles Kennett	1,348	6.8	
Ministerial Liberal	Robert Bruce	766	3.9	
Total formal votes		19,853	93.8	
Informal votes		1,303	6.2	
Turnout		21,156	82.6	
Two-candidate-preferred result
Independent Liberal	Robert Hamilton	11,813	59.5	
Independent Labor	John Smith	8,040	40.5	
Independent Liberal gain from Liberal		Swing		

==== 1943 ====
1943 Victorian state election: Toorak
Party	Candidate	Votes	%	±%
United Australia	Harold Thonemann	11,485	47.0	−53.0
Independent	Charles Kennett	5,617	23.0	+23.0
Independent	Garnet Kerr	4,661	19.1	+19.1
Independent	Francis Connelly	2,677	11.0	+11.0
Total formal votes		24,440	95.8	
Informal votes		1,081	4.2	
Turnout		25,521	84.4	
Two-candidate-preferred result
United Australia	Harold Thonemann	14,699	60.1	−39.9
Independent	Charles Kennett	9,741	39.9	+39.9
United Australia hold		Swing	N/A	

==== 1941 ====
1941 Toorak state by-election
Party	Candidate	Votes	%	±%
United Australia	Harold Thonemann	8,814	39.4	−60.6
Labor	John Ryder	5,832	26.1	+26.1
Independent	Francis Connelly	4,476	20.0	+20.0
Independent	Charles Kennett	2,771	12.4	+12.4
Independent	Garnet Kerr	455	2.0	+2.0
Total formal votes		22,348	97.4	
Informal votes		588	2.6	
Turnout		22,936	83.0	
Two-party-preferred result
United Australia	Harold Thonemann	13,707	61.3	
Labor	John Ryder	8,641	38.7	
United Australia hold		Swing	N/A	

==== 1940 ====
1940 Victorian state election: Toorak
Party	Candidate	Votes	%	±%
United Australia	Stanley Argyle	unopposed		
United Australia hold		Swing	N/A	

=== Elections in the 1930s ===
==== 1937 ====
1937 Victorian state election: Toorak
Party	Candidate	Votes	%	±%
United Australia	Stanley Argyle	15,110	67.5	−32.5
Labor	Frederick Botsman	7,278	32.5	+32.5
Total formal votes		22,388	98.3	
Informal votes		399	1.7	
Turnout		22,787	91.6	
United Australia hold		Swing	N/A	

==== 1935 ====
1935 Victorian state election: Toorak
Party	Candidate	Votes	%	±%
United Australia	Stanley Argyle	unopposed		
United Australia hold		Swing		

==== 1932 ====
1932 Victorian state election: Toorak
Party	Candidate	Votes	%	±%
United Australia	Stanley Argyle	unopposed		
United Australia hold		Swing		

=== Elections in the 1920s ===
==== 1929 ====
1929 Victorian state election: Toorak
Party	Candidate	Votes	%	±%
Nationalist	Stanley Argyle	12,662	63.1	+14.6
Labor	Vic Stout	7,408	36.9	+5.5
Total formal votes		171	99.2	+1.5
Informal votes		171	0.8	−1.5
Turnout		20,241	92.0	+2.1
Nationalist hold		Swing	+1.1	

==== 1927 ====
1927 Victorian state election: Toorak
Party	Candidate	Votes	%	±%
Nationalist	Stanley Argyle	9,458	48.5	
Labor	Charles Cope	6,124	31.4	
Australian Liberal	Horace Mason	3,912	20.1	
Total formal votes		19,494	97.7	
Informal votes		458	2.3	
Turnout		19,952	89.9	
Two-party-preferred result
Nationalist	Stanley Argyle	12,084	62.0	
Labor	Charles Cope	7,410	38.0	
Nationalist hold		Swing		

==== 1924 ====
1924 Victorian state election: Toorak
Party	Candidate	Votes	%	±%
Nationalist	Stanley Argyle	7,741	66.9	−33.1
Labor	Charles Cope	3,826	33.1	+33.1
Total formal votes		11,567	99.2	
Informal votes		89	0.8	
Turnout		11,656	47.7	
Nationalist hold		Swing	N/A	

==== 1921 ====
1921 Victorian state election: Toorak
Party	Candidate	Votes	%	±%
Nationalist	Stanley Argyle	unopposed		
Nationalist hold		Swing		

==== 1920 ====
1920 Victorian state election: Toorak
Party	Candidate	Votes	%	±%
Nationalist	Stanley Argyle	5,528	41.3	+41.3
Labor	Vic Stout	2,968	22.1	+22.1
Nationalist	James Barrett	2,519	18.8	+18.8
Nationalist	Alfred Darroch	2,381	17.8	−17.9
Total formal votes		13,396	93.1	−2.1
Informal votes		988	6.9	+2.1
Turnout		14,384	58.2	+18.6
Two-candidate-preferred result
Nationalist	Stanley Argyle	8,182	61.1	
Nationalist	James Barrett	5,214	38.9	
Nationalist hold		Swing	N/A	

=== Elections in the 1910s ===
==== 1917 ====
1917 Victorian state election: Toorak
Party	Candidate	Votes	%	±%
Nationalist	Norman Bayles	5,756	64.3	−12.5
Nationalist	Alfred Darroch	3,190	35.7	+35.7
Total formal votes		8,946	95.2	−2.8
Informal votes		453	4.8	+2.8
Turnout		9,399	39.6	−2.6
Nationalist hold		Swing	N/A	

==== 1914 ====
1914 Victorian state election: Toorak
Party	Candidate	Votes	%	±%
Liberal	Norman Bayles	7,047	76.8	+17.4
Labor	Philip Behrend	2,129	23.2	+3.7
Total formal votes		9,176	98.0	−0.5
Informal votes		184	2.0	+0.5
Turnout		9,360	42.2	−20.4
Liberal hold		Swing	N/A	

==== 1911 ====
1911 Victorian state election: Toorak
Party	Candidate	Votes	%	±%
Liberal	Norman Bayles	6,801	59.4	+5.5
Independent Liberal	Frank Cornwall	2,422	21.1	−25.0
Labor	Henry Duke	2,234	19.5	+19.5
Total formal votes		11,457	98.5	−1.2
Informal votes		181	1.5	+1.2
Turnout		11,638	62.6	+16.3
Liberal hold		Swing	N/A	

- Preferences were not distributed.

=== Elections in the 1900s ===
==== 1906 by-election ====
1906 Toorak state by-election
Party	Candidate	Votes	%	±%
Ind. Ministerialist	Norman Bayles	1,528	63.7	+63.7
Ministerialist	Louis Holmes	869	36.2	−24.6
Total formal votes		2,397	99.95	
Informal votes		11	0.05	
Turnout		2,409		
Ind. Ministerialist gain from Ministerialist		Swing		
