= Candidates of the 1945 Victorian state election =

The 1945 Victorian state election was held on 10 November 1945.

The incumbent government at this election was led by Ian Macfarlan, and consisted of Liberal, Country Party and Independent members. Although none of these were endorsed by parties, they maintained affiliations. A Ministerial column, comprising members who explicitly supported the Macfarlan government, is included in the table below, with other party affiliations indicated in brackets.

== Seat changes ==
- Boroondara Liberal MLA Trevor Oldham contested Malvern.
- Bulla and Dalhousie Country MLA Leslie Webster contested Mernda.
- Essendon Labor MLA Samuel Merrifield contested Moonee Ponds.
- Flemington Labor MLA Jack Holland contested Footscray.
- Goulburn Valley Country MLA John McDonald contested Shepparton.
- Heidelberg Independent Liberal MLA Henry Zwar contested Preston.
- Kara Kara and Borung Country MLA Finlay Cameron contested Borung.
- Korong and Eaglehawk Country MLA Albert Dunstan contested Korong.
- Lowan Country MLA Wilfred Mibus contested Borung.
- Maryborough and Daylesford Labor MLA Clive Stoneham contested Midlands.
- Nunawading Labor MLA Bob Gray contested Box Hill.
- Ouyen Country MLA Keith Dodgshun contested Rainbow.
- Port Fairy and Glenelg Country MLA Harry Hedditch contested Portland.
- Stawell and Ararat Country MLA Alec McDonald contested Ripon.
- Upper Goulburn ex-Country Independent MLA Edwin Mackrell contested Goulburn.
- Upper Yarra Liberal MLA George Knox contested Scoresby.
- Walhalla Country MLA William Moncur contested Gippsland North.
- Waranga Country MLA Wollaston Heily contested Rodney.
- Warrenheip and Grenville Labor MLA Raymond Hyatt contested Hampden.

== Retiring Members ==
- Country MLA Norman Martin (Gunbower) had resigned in September; no by-election had yet been held.

=== Labor ===
- Ted Cotter MLA (Richmond)
- Bill Hodson MLA (Castlemaine and Kyneton)
- Jack Mullens MLA (Footscray)

=== Country ===
- Lot Diffey MLA (Wangaratta and Ovens)

== Legislative Assembly ==
Sitting members are shown in bold text. Successful candidates are highlighted in the relevant colour. Where there is possible confusion, an asterisk (*) is also used.

Electorate	Held by	Labor candidates	Liberal candidates	Country candidates	Ministerial candidates	Other candidates
Albert Park	Liberal	Frank Crean	John Rasmussen		**William Haworth** (Lib)	James Coull (Ind Soc)
Allandale	Labor	**Patrick Denigan**	Albert Woodward	Russell White		
Ballarat	Liberal	Stanley Glover	**Thomas Hollway**			Albert Black (CPA)
Barwon	Liberal	Don Ferguson	Robert Shirra	James Henderson	**Thomas Maltby** (Lib)	
Benalla	Country			**Frederick Cook***; Percy Johnson		
Benambra	Country	Charles Pollard		**Roy Paton**		
Bendigo	Labor	**Bill Galvin**				
Borung	Country	Arthur Ackland		**Finlay Cameron**; **Wilfred Mibus***		Florence Rodan (Ind); Winton Turnbull (Ind CP)
Box Hill	Labor	**Bob Gray**	Ronald Emerson			Ivy Weber (Ind)
Brighton	Liberal	Val Doube	Ray Tovell		**Ian Macfarlan** (Lib)	
Brunswick	Labor	**James Jewell**	Alfred Wall			
Camberwell	Liberal		Robert Whately		Norman Mackay (Lib)	Walter Fordham (Ind); Dora Nankivell (Ind)
Carlton	Labor	**Bill Barry**				Gerald O'Day (CPA)
Caulfield	Independent		Alexander Dennett			**Andrew Hughes** (Ind)
Clifton Hill	Labor	**Jack Cremean**	Neil McKay			Kenneth Miller (CPA)
Coburg	Independent	Arthur Lewis	Allen Bateman			**Charlie Mutton** (Ind Lab)
Collingwood	Labor	**Tom Tunnecliffe**				
Dandenong	Labor	**Frank Field**	Alexander Caldwell			Clyde Hoffman (Ind Lib); Gladys Roberts (Ind)
Dundas	Labor	**Bill Slater**		Arthur Carracher		
Elsternwick	Liberal		John Don		Roy Schilling (Lib)	Karl Dorr (Ind)
Essendon	Labor	Arthur Drakeford	James Dillon			
Evelyn	Liberal	Clifford Wolfe	Frank Le Leu		**William Everard** (Lib)	
Footscray	Labor	**Jack Holland**				
Geelong	Labor	**Fanny Brownbill**				
Gippsland East	Country	Reuben Basham		**Albert Lind**		
Gippsland North	Country	James Johns		**Bill Fulton**; **William Moncur**		David White (Ind)
Gippsland South	Country	Cecil Shellew		**Herbert Hyland**		
Gippsland West	Country	Robert Baker		**Matthew Bennett**		George Calderwood (Ind)
Glen Iris	Liberal	Thomas Brennan	Alan Moir			Ian McLaren (Ind)
Goulburn	Country	Joseph Smith	Philip Grimwade	Cyril Davy	**Edwin Mackrell** (CP)	
Grant	Country	Geoffrey Ryan	Albert Pennell	**Frederick Holden**		
Hampden	Liberal	**Raymond Hyatt**	Henry Bolte	Harold McLennan	**William Cumming** (Lib)	
Hawthorn	Independent	Charles Murphy	Fred Edmunds		**Leslie Hollins** (Ind)	
Ivanhoe	Liberal		Maxwell Dunn			Robert Gardner (Ind)
Kew	Liberal		**Wilfrid Kent Hughes**			
Korong	Country	William Casey		**Albert Dunstan**		
Malvern	Liberal		**Trevor Oldham**			
Melbourne	Labor	**Tom Hayes**				
Mentone	Liberal	George White	John Warren			Robert Roberts (Ind)
Mernda	Country	Arthur Turtle	Arthur Ireland	**Leslie Webster**		
Midlands	Labor	**Clive Stoneham**		Thomas Grigg		
Mildura	Country	Louis Garlick		Nathaniel Barclay; John Edey	**Albert Allnutt** (CP)	
Moonee Ponds	Labor	**Samuel Merrifield**				
Mornington	Country		Frank Sharpe	**Alfred Kirton**		
Murray Valley	Country	John McCabe		George Moss		Percy Snowden (Ind CP)
Northcote	Labor	**John Cain**				
Oakleigh	Labor	**Squire Reid**	James Smith			
Polwarth	Country	Thomas Carmody		**Edward Guye**		
Portland	Country	Robert Holt		**Harry Hedditch**		
Port Melbourne	Labor	**Tom Corrigan**				Ralph Gibson (CPA)
Prahran	Labor	**Bill Quirk**	Peter Isaacson			Arthur Jackson (Ind Lab)
Preston	Liberal	William Ruthven			**Henry Zwar** (Ind)	Albert Davis (Ind)
Rainbow	Country	John Tripovich		**Keith Dodgshun**		
Richmond	Labor	Stan Keon				Bart Flanagan (CPA)
Ripon	Country	Ernie Morton		**Alec McDonald**		
Rodney	Country	George White		**Richard Brose***; **Wollaston Heily**		Morton Garner (Ind)
Scoresby	Liberal		**George Knox**			
Shepparton	Country	Frederick Hargreaves		**John McDonald**		
St Kilda	Liberal	George Dethbridge	Leslie Lord		**Archie Michaelis** (Lib)	
Sunshine	Labor	Ernie Shepherd				
Swan Hill	Country	William Kent		**Francis Old**		John Hipworth (Ind CP)
Toorak	Liberal		**Harold Thonemann**		Robert Bruce (Lib)	Robert Hamilton* (Ind Lib); Charles Kennett (Ind Lib); Albert Nicholls (Ind Lab); John Smith (Ind Lab)
Warrnambool	Country	James Farrell		**Henry Bailey**		
Williamstown	Labor	**John Lemmon**	William Gray			Alexander Dobbin (CPA)
Wonthaggi	Labor	**William McKenzie**		Alexander Shackleford		

== See also ==
- 1946 Victorian Legislative Council election
