= Electoral results for the district of Dalhousie =

Australian district election results

This is a list of electoral results for the electoral district of Dalhousie in Victorian state elections.

== Members for Dalhousie ==
First incarnation 1859–1889
Member	Term
Peter Snodgrass	Oct. 1859 – Aug. 1864
George John Sands	Nov. 1864 – July 1867
Charles Duffy	Aug. 1867 – Mar. 1874
John Gavan Duffy	May 1874 – Feb. 1886
George John Sands	Mar. 1886 – Mar. 1887
John Gavan Duffy	June 1887^{#} – Mar. 1889

Second incarnation 1904–1927
Member	Party	Term
Reginald Argyle	Unaligned	1904–1914
Allan Cameron	Liberal	1914–1917
Allan Cameron	Nationalist	1917–1923
Reg Pollard	Labor	1924^{#}–1927

^{#} = by-election

== Election results ==
=== Elections in the 1920s ===
1924 Victorian state election: Dalhousie
Party	Candidate	Votes	%	±%
Labor	Reg Pollard	2,232	40.8	+40.8
Nationalist	Angus McNab	1,796	32.9	−67.1
Country	Gerald McKenna	1,438	26.3	+26.3
Total formal votes		5,466	99.4	
Informal votes		36	0.6	
Turnout		5,502	82.1	
Two-party-preferred result
Labor	Reg Pollard	2,857	52.3	+52.3
Nationalist	Angus McNab	2,609	47.7	−52.3
Labor gain from Nationalist		Swing	N/A	

1924 Dalhousie state by-election
Party	Candidate	Votes	%	±%
Nationalist	Angus McNab	1,568	34.2	
Labor	Reg Pollard	1,522	33.3	
Country	Gerald McKenna	1,023	22.3	
Independent	John McCarthy	475	10.4	
Total formal votes		4,588	98.7	
Informal votes		62	1.3	
Turnout		4,650	71.5	
Two-party-preferred result
Labor	Reg Pollard	2,339	51.0	
Nationalist	Angus McNab	2,249	49.0	
Labor gain from Nationalist		Swing	N/A	

1921 Victorian state election: Dalhousie
Party	Candidate	Votes	%	±%
Nationalist	Allan Cameron	unopposed		
Nationalist hold		Swing		

1920 Victorian state election: Dalhousie
Party	Candidate	Votes	%	±%
Nationalist	Allan Cameron	2,482	47.0	+10.9
Victorian Farmers	Thomas Paterson	1,927	36.5	+36.5
Ind. Nationalist	Robert Mitchell	875	16.5	+16.5
Total formal votes		5,284	95.0	−2.5
Informal votes		280	5.0	+2.5
Turnout		5,564	78.9	+4.2
Two-candidate-preferred result
Nationalist	Allan Cameron	2,857	54.1	
Victorian Farmers	Thomas Paterson	2,427	45.9	
Nationalist hold		Swing	N/A	

=== Elections in the 1910s ===
1917 Victorian state election: Dalhousie
Party	Candidate	Votes	%	±%
Nationalist	Reginald Argyle	2,232	42.7	−4.4
Nationalist	Allan Cameron	1,888	36.1	−16.8
Labor	Joseph O'Connor	868	16.6	+16.6
Nationalist	Alexander Wilson	244	4.7	+4.7
Total formal votes		5,232	97.5	−0.4
Informal votes		136	2.5	+0.4
Turnout		5,368	74.7	+2.9
Two-candidate-preferred result
Nationalist	Allan Cameron	2,708	51.8	−1.1
Nationalist	Reginald Argyle	2,524	48.2	+1.1
Nationalist hold		Swing	N/A	

1914 Victorian state election: Dalhousie
Party	Candidate	Votes	%	±%
Independent	Allan Cameron	2,770	52.9	+52.9
Liberal	Reginald Argyle	2,465	47.1	−4.2
Total formal votes		5,235	97.9	−1.4
Informal votes		112	2.1	+1.4
Turnout		5,347	71.8	−5.9
Independent gain from Liberal		Swing	N/A	

1911 Victorian state election: Dalhousie
Party	Candidate	Votes	%	±%
Liberal	Reginald Argyle	3,010	51.3	+0.9
Independent	John Duffy	1,615	27.5	−22.1
Labor	Richard Taafe	1,239	21.1	+21.1
Total formal votes		5,864	98.7	–0.6
Informal votes		75	1.3	+0.6
Turnout		5,939	77.7	+1.9
Liberal hold		Swing	N/A	

- Preferences were not distributed.
