= Electoral results for the district of Mernda =

Australian district election results

This is a list of electoral results for the electoral district of Mernda in Victorian state elections.

== Members for Mernda ==
Member	Party	Term
Leslie Webster	Country	1945–1947
Arthur Ireland	Liberal	1947–1952
Edmund Morrissey	Labor	1952–1955
Edmund Morrissey	Labor (Anti-Communist)	1955

== Election results ==
=== Elections in the 1950s ===
1952 Victorian state election: Mernda
Party	Candidate	Votes	%	±%
Labor	Edmund Morrissey	8,694	50.9	−9.8
Liberal	Arthur Ireland	8,389	49.1	+9.8
Total formal votes		17,083	98.5	+3.2
Informal votes		259	1.5	−3.2
Turnout		17,342	92.5	−0.2
Labor gain from Liberal and Country		Swing	+9.8	

1950 Victorian state election: Mernda
Party	Candidate	Votes	%	±%
Liberal and Country	Arthur Ireland	8,792	60.7	+21.5
Labor	Russell Smith	5,695	39.3	+39.3
Total formal votes		14,487	95.3	−3.3
Informal votes		717	4.7	+3.3
Turnout		15,204	92.7	+0.2
Liberal and Country hold		Swing	N/A	

=== Elections in the 1940s ===
1947 Victorian state election: Mernda
Party	Candidate	Votes	%	±%
Liberal	Arthur Ireland	5,042	39.2	+6.4
Independent Labor	Jack Gill	4,280	31.6	+31.6
Country	Leslie Webster	4,223	31.2	−2.9
Total formal votes		13,545	98.6	+0.4
Informal votes		186	1.4	−0.4
Turnout		13,731	92.5	+5.2
Two-candidate-preferred result
Liberal	Arthur Ireland	8,857	65.4	+65.4
Independent Labor	Jack Gill	4,688	34.6	+34.6
Liberal gain from Country		Swing	N/A	

1945 Victorian state election: Mernda
Party	Candidate	Votes	%	±%
Country	Leslie Webster	3,991	34.0	
Labor	Arthur Turtle	3,880	33.1	
Liberal	Arthur Ireland	3,847	32.8	
Total formal votes		11,718	98.2	
Informal votes		220	1.8	
Turnout		11,938	87.2	
Two-party-preferred result
Country	Leslie Webster	6,898	58.9	
Labor	Arthur Turtle	4,820	41.1	
Country hold		Swing		
