= Electoral results for the district of Bulla and Dalhousie =

Australian district election results

This is a list of electoral results for the electoral district of Bulla and Dalhousie in Victorian state elections.

== Members for Bulla and Dalhousie ==
Member	Party	Term
Reg Pollard	Labor	1927–1932
Harry White	United Australia	1932–1943
Reginald James	Country	1943–1944
Leslie Webster	Country	1944–1945

== Election results ==
=== Elections in the 1940s ===
1944 Bulla and Dalhousie state by-election
Party	Candidate	Votes	%	±%
Labor	Reginald Hoban	2,688	31.8	−2.4
Country	Leslie Webster	2,502	29.6	N/A
Liberal	Aubrey Saunders	1,451	17.1	+0.1
Independent	Albert Pennell	1,002	11.8	+11.8
Independent	Edward Cummins	822	9.7	+9.7
Total formal votes		8,465	98.0	+1.1
Informal votes		170	2.0	−1.1
Turnout		8,635	84.7	−3.6
Two-party-preferred result
Country	Leslie Webster	4,730	55.9	+0.2
Labor	Reginald Hoban	3,735	44.1	−0.2
Country hold		Swing	+0.2	

1943 Victorian state election: Bulla and Dalhousie
Party	Candidate	Votes	%	±%
Labor	Edward Cummins	3,003	34.2	−1.9
Country	Reginald James	1,689	19.3	−5.4
United Australia	Aubrey Saunders	1,493	17.0	−22.2
Ind. United Australia	Howard Everard	1,487	16.9	+16.9
Country	John Ryan	1,100	12.5	+12.5
Total formal votes		8,772	96.9	−2.1
Informal votes		280	3.1	+2.1
Turnout		9,052	88.3	−4.6
Two-party-preferred result
Country	Reginald James	4,882	55.7	+55.7
Labor	Edward Cummins	3,890	44.3	−3.4
Country gain from United Australia		Swing	N/A	

1940 Victorian state election: Bulla and Dalhousie
Party	Candidate	Votes	%	±%
United Australia	Harry White	3,581	39.2	−6.2
Labor	Charlie Mutton	3,304	36.1	+5.5
Country	John Milligan	2,254	24.7	+0.7
Total formal votes		9,139	99.0	+0.1
Informal votes		94	1.0	−0.1
Turnout		9,233	92.9	−0.7
Two-party-preferred result
United Australia	Harry White	4,781	52.3	−4.0
Labor	Charlie Mutton	4,358	47.7	+4.0
United Australia hold		Swing	−4.0	

=== Elections in the 1930s ===
1937 Victorian state election: Bulla and Dalhousie
Party	Candidate	Votes	%	±%
United Australia	Harry White	4,243	45.4	−0.6
Labor	Charlie Mutton	2,866	30.6	−3.3
Country	John Milligan	2,241	24.0	+3.9
Total formal votes		9,350	98.9	−0.1
Informal votes		102	1.1	+0.1
Turnout		9,452	93.6	−0.8
Two-party-preferred result
United Australia	Harry White	5,262	56.3	−2.6
Labor	Charles Mutton	4,088	43.7	+2.6
United Australia hold		Swing	−2.6	

1935 Victorian state election: Bulla and Dalhousie
Party	Candidate	Votes	%	±%
United Australia	Harry White	4,353	46.0	+15.1
Labor	Charlie Mutton	3,206	33.9	−8.2
Country	John Ryan	1,905	20.1	−7.0
Total formal votes		9,464	99.0	0.0
Informal votes		93	1.0	0.0
Turnout		9,557	94.4	+1.6
Two-party-preferred result
United Australia	Harry White	5,573	58.9	+4.6
Labor	Charlie Mutton	3,891	41.1	−4.6
United Australia hold		Swing	+4.6	

1932 Victorian state election: Bulla and Dalhousie
Party	Candidate	Votes	%	±%
Labor	Reg Pollard	4,004	42.1	−12.2
United Australia	Harry White	2,937	30.9	+6.0
Country	Leon Stahl	2,578	27.1	+6.4
Total formal votes		9,519	99.0	+0.2
Informal votes		99	1.0	−0.2
Turnout		9,618	92.8	+0.9
Two-party-preferred result
United Australia	Harry White	5,164	54.3	+10.6
Labor	Reg Pollard	4,355	45.7	−10.6
United Australia gain from Labor		Swing	+10.6	

=== Elections in the 1920s ===
1929 Victorian state election: Bulla and Dalhousie
Party	Candidate	Votes	%	±%
Labor	Reg Pollard	4,911	54.3	+6.3
Nationalist	Francis Lobb	2,253	24.9	+4.5
Country	Claude Anderson	1,876	20.7	+2.1
Total formal votes		9,040	98.8	+0.6
Informal votes		111	1.2	−0.6
Turnout		9,151	91.9	+2.9
Two-party-preferred result
Labor	Reg Pollard		56.3	+0.2
Nationalist	Francis Lobb		43.7	−0.2
Labor hold		Swing	+0.2	

- Two party preferred vote was estimated.

1927 Victorian state election: Bulla and Dalhousie
Party	Candidate	Votes	%	±%
Labor	Reg Pollard	4,183	48.0	
Nationalist	Andrew Rowan	1,774	20.4	
Country	Alexander Wilson	1,625	18.6	
Australian Liberal	John Murphy	1,131	13.0	
Total formal votes		8,713	98.2	
Informal votes		159	1.8	
Turnout		8,872	89.0	
After distribution of preferences
Labor	Reg Pollard	4,695	53.9	
Nationalist	Andrew Rowan	2,118	24.3	
Country	Alexander Wilson	1,900	21.8	
Labor hold		Swing		

- Preferences were not distributed to completion.
