= Electoral district of Kyneton =

Former state electoral district of Victoria, Australia

Kyneton Victoria—Legislative Assembly
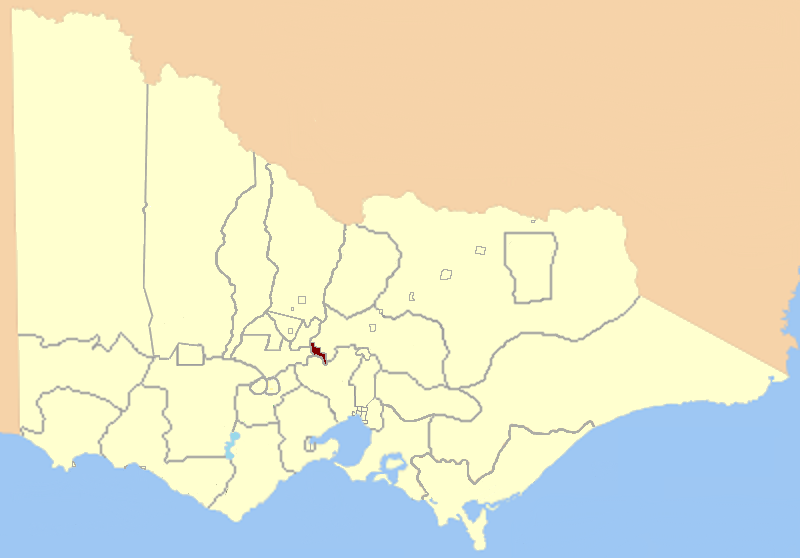
- Kyneton Boroughs (similar to district of Kyneton)
- State: Victoria
- Created: 1889; 136 years ago
- Abolished: 1904; 121 years ago
- Namesake: Town of Kyneton
- Demographic: Rural
- Coordinates: 37°14′S 144°26′E

Kyneton was an electoral district of the Legislative Assembly in the Australian state of Victoria centred on Kyneton from 1889 to 1904.

The Electoral district of Kyneton Boroughs (1856–1889) preceded the district of Kyneton. Charles Young was the last member for Kyneton Boroughs, representing the district from 1874 until its abolition in 1889. Kyneton was abolished in the 1904 redistribution when several new districts were created or re-created including the Electoral district of Dalhousie. Reginald Argyle, the last member for Kyneton, represented Dalhousie 1904–1914.

== Members for Kyneton ==
Member	Term
Charles Young	Apr 1889 – Apr 1892
Hugh Rawson	May 1892 – Oct 1900
Reginald Ivon Argyle	Nov 1900 – May 1904
