= Reginald Argyle =

Australian politician

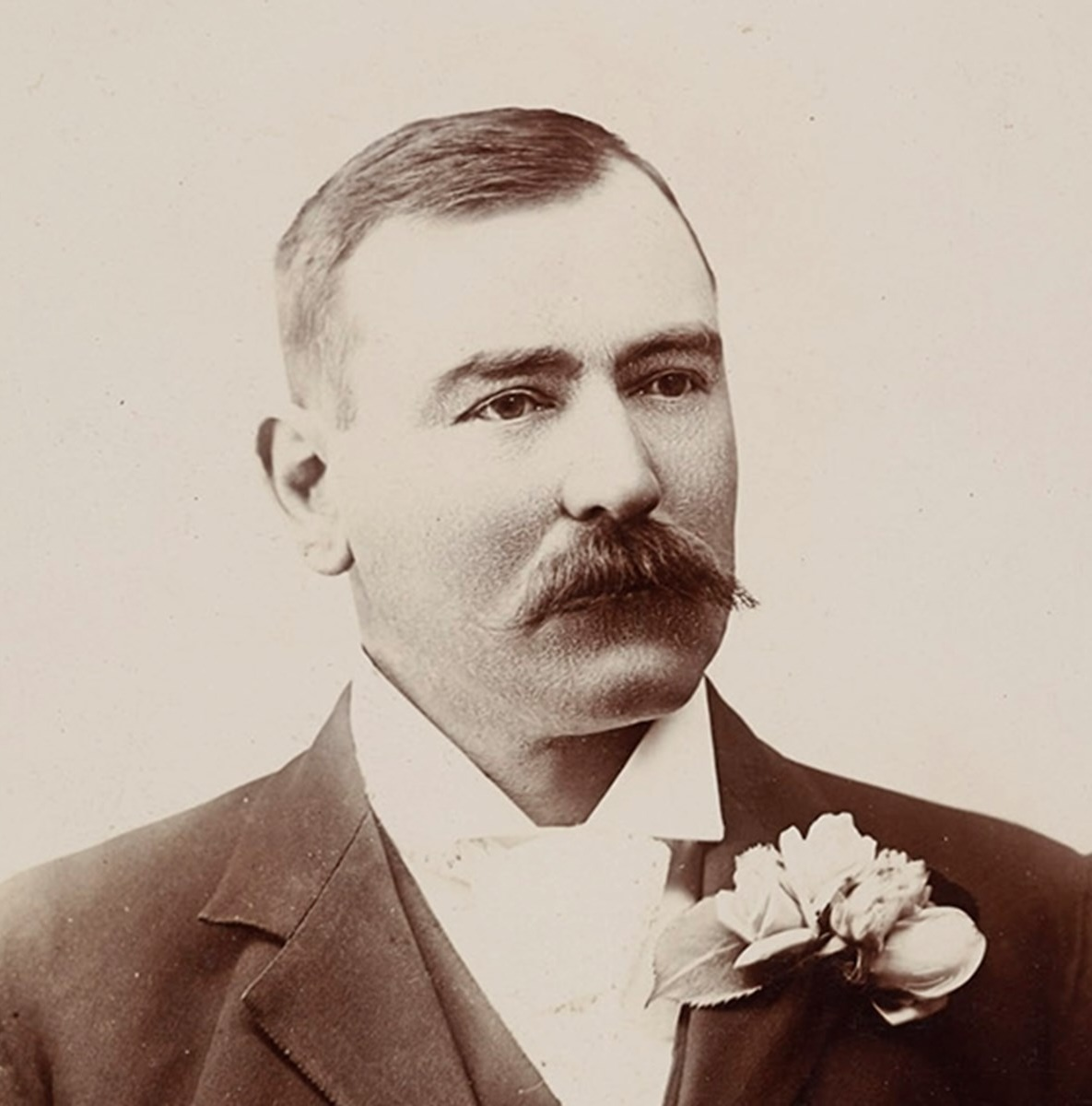

Member of the Victorian Legislative Assembly for Electoral district of Kyneton
- In office November 1900 – May 1904
- Preceded by: Hugh Rawson
- Succeeded by: seat abolished

Member of the Victorian Legislative Assembly for Electoral district of Dalhousie
- In office June 1904 – November 1914
- Preceded by: seat created
- Succeeded by: Allan Cameron

Personal details
- Born: 11 December 1859 Kyneton, Victoria
- Died: 3 September 1936 (aged 76) Bayswater, Victoria
- Party: Liberal Party
- Relations: Stanley Argyle (brother)

Reginald Ivon Argyle (11 December 1859 – 3 September 1936) was an Australian politician in the Victorian Legislative Assembly. Argyle served as the member for Kyneton between November 1900 and May 1904, then as the member for Dalhousie between 1904 and 1914.

Argyle served as Government Whip in the Legislative Assembly and Cabinet Secretary between 1902 and 1909.

He was elected a councillor at a Kyneton municipal by-election in November 1897 and re-elected in August 1898.
