= 1906 Toorak state by-election =

- 10 October 1906

Electoral district of Toorak in the Victorian Legislative Assembly
| | First party | Second party |
|---|---|---|
| | IND | MIN |
| Candidate | Norman Bayles | Norman Bayles |
| Party | Ind. Ministerialist | Ministerialist |
| Popular vote | 1,528 | 869 |
| Percentage | 63.7% | 36.2 |
| Swing | ▲63.7% | ▼24.6% |
MP before election
George Fairbairn
Ministerialist
Elected MP
Norman Bayles
Ind. Ministerialist

The 1906 Toorak state by-election was held on 10 October 1906 to elect the next member for Toorak in the Victorian Legislative Assembly, following the resignation of incumbent MP George Fairbairn.

Fairbairn resigned to contest the newly created seat of Fawkner in the Australian House of Representatives at the 1906 federal election.

The by-election was won by Independent Ministerialist candidate Norman Bayles, although he later joined the Ministerialists.

== Results ==
1906 Toorak state by-election
| Party | Candidate | Votes | % | ±% |
|---|---|---|---|---|
| Ind. Ministerialist | Norman Bayles | 1,528 | 63.7 | +63.7 |
| Ministerialist | Louis Holmes | 869 | 36.2 | −24.6 |
| Total formal votes | | 2,397 | 99.95 | |
| Informal votes | | 11 | 0.05 | |
| Turnout | | 2,409 | | |
| Ind. Ministerialist gain from Ministerialist | | Swing | | |
