= Leslie Webster =

Leslie Webster may refer to:

- Leslie Webster (art historian), British and female, born 1943, Anglo-Saxon specialist at the British Museum
- Leslie Webster (Australian politician), male, 1891–1975, Country Party in Victoria
