= Tamra Mercieca =

Australian life coach

- Born: 29 September 1980 (age 45); Kyneton, Victoria, Australia
- Occupations: Relationship and Self-Love Therapist, Author and founder of Getting Naked Pty Ltd.
- Website: Tamra Mercieca

Tamra Mercieca (born 29 September 1980) is an Australian author, therapist, and founder of Getting Naked Pty Ltd.

== Biography ==
Mercieca was born in Kyneton, Victoria, Australia. She attended Kyneton Secondary College, before going on to complete a Graduate Diploma of Arts in Commercial Radio in Melbourne. She spent ten years working in radio as a newsreader and journalist.

== Career ==
In 2002, Mercieca won the Australian Commercial Radio Award for Best News Presenter in a provincial market. During this time, she also had walk-on roles in various television shows such as Neighbours, Last Man Standing, and 'The Secret Life of Us'.

Writing from a young age, it wasn't until her own battle with depression that she was inspired to pen her first book, The Upside of Down: A personal journey and toolkit for overcoming depression, self-published in Australia in 2009. The book was endorsed by Lifeline Australia – the organization asking her to become an advocate.

She authored Getting Naked: The Dating Game (2011), recounting her personal journey navigating relationships and love.

Mercieca contributes to national television shows such as Seven Network's The Morning Show and Sunrise and Network 10's The Circle, radio stations, publications, and events. Her articles feature in publications such as The Sunday Herald Sun's Body and Soul section, Women's Health and Fitness magazine, Good Health magazine and her own sex column in Nature and Health magazine.

== Awards and nominations ==
| Award | Date | Category | Outcome |
|---|---|---|---|
| Australian Commercial Radio Award | 2002 | Best News Presenter in a Provincial market | Won |
