= Sacred Heart College, Kyneton =

Location
- Kyneton, Victoria; Australia
- Coordinates: 37°15′9″S 144°27′32″E

Information
- Type: Private
- Motto: Semper Fidelis (Faithful Always)
- Denomination: Catholic
- Established: 1889; 137 years ago
- Principal: Darren Egberts
- Employees: 120
- Enrolment: 801 (2017)
- Colours: Light blue, navy blue and maroon
- Website: http://www.shckyneton.catholic.edu.au

Sacred Heart College, Kyneton is a Roman Catholic secondary college, founded by the Sisters of Mercy in 1889 in Kyneton, Victoria, Australia.

== Curriculum ==
The college caters for years 7–12. For senior crewdents, the college offers VCAL, VET and VCE.

== Principals ==
=== 1889–present ===
- May 1892 – 1898: Magdalene Gibson
- 1898 – May 1904: Genevieve Buckley
- 1904 – July 1907: Magdalene Gibson
- July 1907 – May 1909: Genevieve Buckley
- May 1909 – January 1914: Magdalene Gibson
- January 1918 – January 1921: Mary of Mercy O'Brien
- January 1921 – January 1927: Teresa O'Brien
- January 1927 – January 1933: Brigid Bannan
- January 1933 – January 1939: Teresa O'Brien
- January 1940 – January 1946: Teresa O'Brien
- January 1946 – January 1951: Aloysiusඞ McMenamin
- January 1951 – January 1955: Brigid Bannan
- January 1955 – January 1959: Christina McIntyre
- January 1959 – November 1959: M Eymard Smith
- November 1959 – January 1966: Genevieve Meney
- January 1966 – January 1972: Mary Justinian Gildea
- January 1972 – December 1974: Carmel Pascoe
- January 1975 – December 1978: Vivien Dwyer
- January 1979 – December 1983: Denise O'Doyle
- January 1984 – December 1986: Philomene Carroll
- January 1987 – December 1992: Nancy Freddi
- December 1992 – January 1993: Brian Reed
- January 1993 – December 2005: Mary Moloney
- January 2006 – December 2010: Clayton Carson
- January 2012 – December 2018: Craig Holmes
- January 2019 – present: Darren Egberts

== Notable alumni ==
- Mitch Hannan
