= Tom Sutherland (footballer) =

Australian rules footballer, born 1910

Personal information
- Full name: Joseph William Sutherland
- Born: 22 June 1910; Kyneton, Victoria
- Died: 17 July 1981 (aged 71); Footscray, Victoria
- Original team: Sunshine
- Height: 183 cm (6 ft 0 in)
- Weight: 91 kg (201 lb)

Playing career^{1}
Years	Club	Games (Goals)
1930–1934	Footscray	10 (12)
1935–1938	St Kilda	18 (18)
1939–1941	Hawthorn	19 (17)
Total		47 (47)
- ^{1} Playing statistics correct to the end of 1941.

Joseph William "Tom" Sutherland (22 June 1910 – 17 July 1981) was an Australian rules footballer who played with Footscray, St Kilda and Hawthorn in the Victorian Football League (VFL). Sutherland had a career that was marred by injuries.

Sutherland was born in Kyneton but recruited from Melbourne club Sunshine. He kicked a career best six goals in the opening round of the 1936 VFL season, against Richmond. In his 12 season career he rarely put together a string of games, with his most productive year being an 11 game effort in that 1936 season. He didn't play senior VFL football in 1931 or 1933. His career ended when he enlisted in the Australian Army to serve in World War II, as he was 34 by the time he was discharged in 1945.
