= Rowland Holle =

New Zealand cricketer

Personal information
- Full name: Rowland Leate Holle
- Born: 1859; Kyneton, Victoria, Australia
- Died: 3 August 1929 (aged 69–70); Sydney, Australia

Domestic team information
- Years: Team
- 1883/84–1886/87: Wellington
- 1893/94: Auckland

Career statistics
Competition	First-class
Matches	7
Runs scored	70
Batting average	5.83
100s/50s	0/0
Top score	17
Balls bowled	476
Wickets	20
Bowling average	10.90
5 wickets in innings	1
10 wickets in match	0
Best bowling	5/22
Catches/stumpings	2/–
- Source: ESPNcricinfo, 30 December 2021

Rowland Leate Holle (1859 – 3 August 1929) was an Australian-born New Zealand cricketer. He played first-class cricket for Wellington and Auckland between 1883 and 1894.

== Life and career ==
Holle was born in Victoria, Australia. He was employed as a cutter and manager at the Wellington clothing factory Thompson, Shannon and Co in 1883.

On his first-class debut for Wellington in December 1883, Holle took 5 for 22 and 4 for 20 – all on the first day of the match – but Wellington still lost to Nelson by 39 runs in a match in which 40 wickets fell for only 183 runs. In the 1893–94 season when he captained Auckland on their three-match southern tour, he played as a batsman. In the last match, going to the wicket at No. 11 with 13 runs required, he scored the winning runs to take Auckland to victory over Wellington by one wicket. The Wellington Evening Post described the match as "the most exciting inter-provincial match ever played in New Zealand". Holle wrote an account of the Auckland team's tour which was published as a pamphlet in March 1894: Tour of the Auckland Representative Cricket Team, 1893.

Holle served on the committee of the Auckland Cricket Association in the 1890s. He worked in Auckland as the Arch Clark and Sons clothing factory manager. He returned to Australia in March 1897 to live in Sydney.

Holle married Amelia ("Millie") Corder in Wellington in September 1883. He died in Sydney in 1929, aged 69; she died in Brisbane in 1938; they had a son and a daughter.
