= Bruce Manor =

Heritage-listed house in Melbourne, Victoria, Australia

- Location of the house in Greater Metropolitan Melbourne
- Former names: Pinehill

General information
- Status: Completed
- Type: House
- Architectural style: Inter-war Spanish Mission
- Location: 34 Pinehill Drive, Frankston, City of Frankston, Melbourne, Victoria, Australia
- Coordinates: 38°09′47″S 145°09′04″E
- Year built: 1926–1927
- Completed: 1927; 99 years ago
- Cost: £20,000
- Client: Stanley Melbourne Bruce

Technical details
- Material: Bricks; stucco; timber
- Floor area: 2
- Grounds: 8.1 ha (20 acres) (1926); 6,000 m^{2} (65,000 sq ft) (2002); 4,565 m^{2} (49,140 sq ft) (2012)

Design and construction
- Architect: Robert Bell Hamilton
- Architecture firm: Prevost Synnot and Rewald

Victorian Heritage Register
- Official name: Bruce Manor
- Type: Registered place
- Designated: 9 September 2004
- Reference no.: H1998
- Heritage overlay no.: HO
- Categories: Residential buildings (private); Education

Bruce Manor, formerly known as Pinehill, (Note: With one source spelling as Pine Hill.) is a house located at 34 Pinehill Drive in Frankston, in the City of Frankston, in the south eastern suburbs of Melbourne, in Victoria, Australia.

Built between 1926 and 1927 on the traditional lands of the Bunurong people, the house was added to the Victorian Heritage Register on 9 September 2004 in recognition of its architectural and historical significance; and was also added to a non-statutory list by the Victorian branch of the National Trust on 12 February 1981. It was rejected for inclusion to the now defunct Register of the National Estate on an unknown date.

== History ==
An eight-hectare (twenty-acre) portion, subdivided from the original 160-hectare (400-acre) estate, was purchased by Stanley Melbourne Bruce (Note: Later Viscount Bruce of Melbourne.) in 1926, during his tenure as Prime Minister of Australia. Bruce commissioned the Sydney firm of architects Prevost Synnot and Rewald, in association with Robert Bell Hamilton, to design Pinehill as a Mediterranean-inspired residence with paved courtyards, Cordova-patterned roof tiles, a Juliet balcony, and timber panelled interiors.

Before entering politics Bruce graduated from Cambridge University and was admitted to the Bar in England in 1907 and was a businessman involved in the importing business set up by his father, Paterson, Laing & Bruce. During World War I, he served with the Royal Fusiliers at Gallipoli, where he was wounded twice and received the Military Cross. Elected to the Australian House of Representatives as the Member for Flinders in 1918, Bruce was a prominent and distinguished figure in Australian politics throughout the 1920s, and served as prime minister from 1923 to 1929, when he became the first prime minister to occupy The Lodge, in Canberra. The house at Pinehill, later to become more commonly known as Bruce Manor, was commissioned during his tenure as prime minister. It is not known how long the house remained in Bruce's possession, and he did not live in the house for long, as he left Australia for England in 1932 to serve as the Australian High Commissioner until 1945, and only returned for brief periods until his death in London in 1967.

The remaining portion of the original estate subsequently became the Frankston Golf Club.

In the early 1970s, Bruce Manor was repurposed as hostel accommodation for the aged.

Set on 6,000 square metres (65,000 sq ft), the house was purchased in 2002 for $895,000, after which the land was subdivided and ten townhouses were built. Reduced to 4,565 square metres (49,140 sq ft), in 2012, at the direction of liquidators, the un-renovated house was sold for A$1.225 million, and again listed for sale, renovated, in 2025.

== Description ==
Bruce Manor is a large two-storey rendered brick house with flanking single storey wings and a central court, designed to create an impression of grandeur and affluence. The house alludes to the Inter-war Spanish Mission style with vari-coloured semicircular tiles, arcaded entries, grilled balconette, and swirling coloured render originally pinky-buff with blue shutters and doors. The interior of the house has been completed in a neo-Elizabethan style with innovative details. Below the house is a three-car garage. The extensive grounds in which the house originally stood have disappeared due to road and golf course development.

The house is of architectural significance as a substantial and near complete example of a Mediterranean style house. In the 1920s and 1930s houses of this style and scale were popularised by magazines such as Australian Home Beautiful. Mediterranean-inspired designs were seen to be glamorous manifestations of Hollywood and the film industry and much more exotic than the modest Georgian or California Bungalow styles which were prevalent at the time.

Whilst the building no longer has 'buff pink' walls or vivid blue shutters and doors, it has retained its original fittings, fixtures, piazzas and arcaded verandah and remains as a building of high integrity. Bruce Manor was influential in the stylistic development of architecture in Victoria and examples of this can be seen in later modest developments in areas such as Camberwell. The building also has an important association with The Lodge in Canberra which was constructed in 1926; both were built in a similar architectural style and both were first lived in by Bruce.

In rejecting its inclusion on the now defunct Register of the National Estate, it was noted that "…Pinehill is not a particularly rare or outstanding type of house for its period… [and] does not reach the threshold for any of the criteria for inclusion in the Register of the National Estate."

== See also ==
- Architecture of Melbourne
- List of places on the Victorian Heritage Register in the City of Frankston
