= Stanley Argyle =

Australian politician (1867–1940)

The Honourable Sir Stanley Argyle KBE, MRCS, LRCP
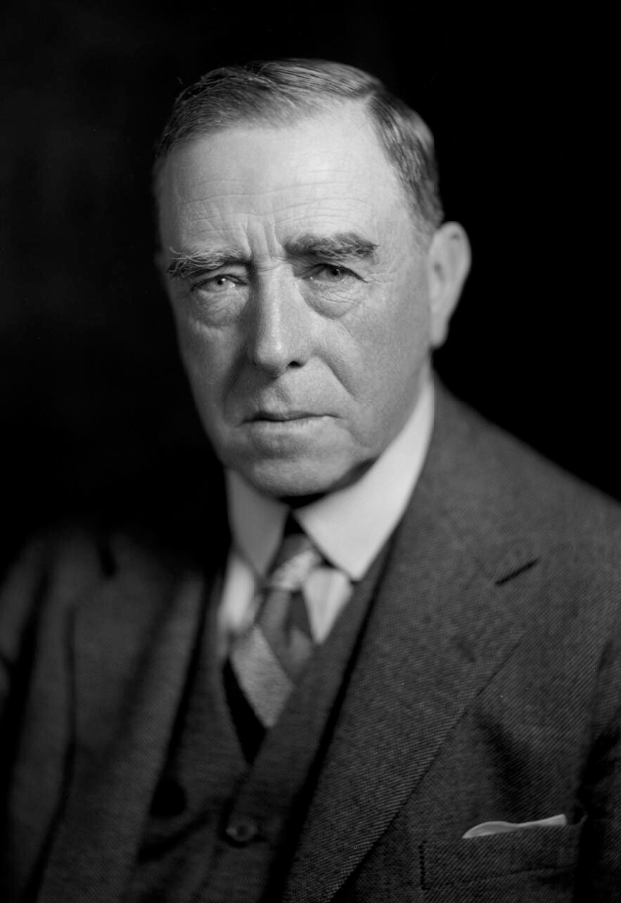
- Argyle in 1935

32nd Premier of Victoria
- In office 19 May 1932 – 2 April 1935
- Monarch: George V
- Governor: The Lord Somers; The Lord Huntingfield
- Deputy: Robert Menzies; Ian Macfarlan; Wilfrid Kent Hughes
- Preceded by: Edmond Hogan
- Succeeded by: Albert Dunstan

Treasurer of Victoria
- In office 19 May 1932 – 2 April 1935
- Preceded by: Edmond Hogan
- Succeeded by: Albert Dunstan

7th Leader of the Opposition in Victoria
- In office 2 April 1935 – 23 November 1940
- Premier: Albert Dunstan
- Deputy: Ian Macfarlan; Wilfrid Kent Hughes
- Preceded by: Thomas Tunnecliffe
- Succeeded by: Thomas Hollway
- In office 3 September 1930 – 19 May 1932
- Premier: Edmond Hogan
- Deputy: Ian Macfarlan
- Preceded by: William McPherson
- Succeeded by: Thomas Tunnecliffe
Party positions
Leader of the United Australia Party in Victoria
In office 15 September 1931 – 23 November 1940
Deputy	Ian Macfarlan; Robert Menzies; Ian Macfarlan; Wilfrid Kent Hughes
Preceded by	Position established
Succeeded by	Thomas Hollway
Leader of the Nationalist Party in Victoria
In office 3 September 1930 – 15 September 1931
Deputy	Ian Macfarlan
Preceded by	William McPherson
Succeeded by	Position abolished
Deputy Leader of the Nationalist Party in Victoria
In office 5 September 1928 – 3 September 1930
Leader	William McPherson
Preceded by	Position established
Succeeded by	Ian Macfarlan
Cabinet posts
Chief Secretary of Victoria
In office 22 November 1928 – 12 December 1929
Premier	William McPherson
Preceded by	G. M. Prendergast
Succeeded by	Thomas Tunnecliffe
In office 18 November 1924 – 20 May 1927
Premier	John Allan
Preceded by	Thomas Tunnecliffe
Succeeded by	G. M. Prendergast
In office 7 September 1923 – 18 July 1924
Premier	Harry Lawson
Preceded by	Matthew Baird
Succeeded by	Thomas Tunnecliffe
Minister of Public Health
In office 22 November 1928 – 12 December 1929
Premier	William McPherson
Preceded by	W. J. Beckett
Succeeded by	W. J. Beckett
In office 18 November 1924 – 20 May 1927
Premier	John Allan
Preceded by	John Percy Jones
Succeeded by	W. J. Beckett
In office 7 September 1923 – 18 July 1924
Premier	Harry Lawson; Alexander Peacock
Preceded by	Matthew Baird
Succeeded by	John Percy Jones
Electorate
Member of the Victorian Legislative Assembly for Toorak
In office 1 October 1920 – 1 November 1940
Preceded by	Norman Bayles
Succeeded by	Harold Thonemann

Personal details
- Born: Stanley Seymour Argyle; 4 December 1867 Kyneton, Colony of Victoria
- Died: 23 November 1940 (aged 72) Toorak, Victoria, Australia
- Party: Nationalist (until 1931); United Australia (from 1931)
- Height: 5 ft 11 in (180 cm)
- Spouse: Violet Ellen Jessie Lewis (m. 1895; died 1940)
- Children: 4
- Relatives: Michael (cousin)
- Education: Kyneton School; Hawthorn Grammar School; Brighton Grammar School
- Alma mater: Trinity College, Melbourne; King's College London

Military service
- Allegiance: Australia
- Branch/service: Australian Imperial Force
- Years of service: 1914–1917
- Rank: Lieutenant colonel
- Battles/wars: First World War

Sir Stanley Seymour Argyle KBE, MRCS, LRCP (4 December 1867 – 23 November 1940), was an Australian radiologist and politician. He served as premier of Victoria from 1932 to 1935 and was the state leader of the Nationalist Party and United Australia Party from 1930 until his death in 1940.

== Early life ==
Argyle was born in Kyneton, Colony of Victoria in 1867 to Edward Argyle, a grazier from England, and Mary Clark. He was educated at the Kyneton School, Hawthorn Grammar School, and Brighton Grammar School before attending Trinity College at the University of Melbourne, where he graduated in medicine. He went on to study bacteriology at King's College London.

== Political career ==
After further study in the United Kingdom, he went into general practice in Kew and was later a pioneer of radiology in Australia. He was a member of the Kew City Council from 1898 to 1905 and was mayor from in 1903 to 1905. During the First World War, he was consultant radiologist to the Australian Imperial Force in Egypt, France and England. He returned to Australia in 1917 with the rank of lieutenant colonel and resumed his medical practice at the Alfred Hospital in Melbourne. He invested in the pasteurization of milk and citrus growing.

In 1920, Argyle was elected to the Victorian Legislative Assembly for the seat of Toorak as an independent Nationalist. Between 1923 and 1928, he was Chief Secretary and Minister for Health in the ministries of Harry Lawson, John Allan, Alexander Peacock and William McPherson. When McPherson resigned as leader of the Nationalist Party, Argyle was chosen to succeed him and, in 1931, the party was renamed the United Australia Party (UAP). He led the opposition to Ned Hogan's minority Labor Party government, which was unable to cope with the effects of the Great Depression and was heavily defeated at the May 1932 elections.

Argyle formed a coalition government with the Country Party, led by Allan and later by Albert Dunstan. The government had a huge majority – 45 seats to Labor's 16. Ministers included the rising star of the UAP, Robert Menzies, who became Deputy Premier, Attorney-General and Minister for Railways. Argyle, a firm fiscal conservative, held to the orthodox view that in a time of depression government spending must be cut so that the budget remained in balance. This soon brought him into conflict with both the trade unions and the farmers, but at the time there seemed to be no alternative policy. Argyle was lucky in that the economy began to improve from 1932, and the unemployment rate fell from 27 percent in 1932 to 20 percent in 1934 and 14 percent in 1935. That led a reduction in unemployment relief payments and an increase in taxation revenue, easing the state's financial crisis.

Argyle fought the March 1935 election with an improving economy and a record of sound, if unimaginative, management. With the Labor Party opposition still divided and demoralized, he was rewarded with another very comfortable majority for his coalition government. However, at that point he was unexpectedly betrayed by his Country Party allies. The Country Party leader, Albert Dunstan, was a close friend of the gambling boss John Wren, who was also very close to the Labor leader Tom Tunnecliffe (in the view of most historians, Tunnecliffe was, in fact, under Wren's control). Wren, aided by the Victorian Labor Party President, Arthur Calwell, persuaded Dunstan to break off the coalition with Argyle and form a minority Country Party government, which Labor would support in return for some policy concessions. Dunstan agreed to the deal and, in April 1935, he moved a successful no confidence vote in the government from which he had just resigned.

The UAP (and later its successor the Liberal Party) never forgave the Country Party for that treachery. Henry Bolte, later Victoria's longest-serving Premier, was 27 in 1935, and Dunstan's betrayal of Argyle lay behind his lifelong intense dislike of the Country Party, whom he called "political prostitutes". Argyle remained in politics as Leader of the Opposition until his death in 1940.

== Personal life ==
Argyle married Violet Ellen Jessie Lewis of "Spring Grove", Cotham Road, Kew at Holy Trinity Church, Kew on 24 January 1895. They had two sons and two daughters; the first of their children, Inez, was born on 2 November 1895. The next, Bessie Abbott, was born on 26 March 1897. Their elder son, Thomas Milner Stanley, was born on 11 October 1899; the younger, Hector Stanley, was born on 2 October 1901. The Argyles lived at Kew until 1919 when they purchased a property, "Halstead", at 29 Bruce Street, Toorak. In 1933, that house was demolished and a new one built to the design of architect Marcus Martin. After the death of her husband, Lady Argyle moved to Perth to be near her son Tom and his family. She died in Perth in 1963 at the age of 94. By that time, three of her four children were living in Perth.

Argyle was a cousin of the British judge Michael Argyle. One of his great-granddaughters is Fiona Argyle, who was the mayor of Nedlands in Western Australia from 2021 to 2025.

== Bibliography ==
- Geoff Browne, A Biographical Register of the Victorian Parliament, 1900–84, Government Printer, Melbourne, 1985
- Don Garden, Victoria: A History, Thomas Nelson, Melbourne, 1984
- Kate White, John Cain and Victorian Labour 1917–1957, Hale and Iremonger, Sydney, 1982
- Raymond Wright, A People's Counsel. A History of the Parliament of Victoria, 1856–1990, Oxford University Press, Melbourne, 1992

Victorian Legislative Assembly
Preceded by Norman Bayles	Member for Toorak; 1920–1940	Succeeded by Harold Thonemann
Political offices
Preceded by Edmond Hogan	Premier of Victoria; 1932–1935	Succeeded by Albert Dunstan
Party political offices
Preceded by William McPherson	Leader of the Nationalist Party in Victoria; 1930–1931	Became the United Australia Party
New party	Leader of the United Australia Party in Victoria; 1931–1940	Succeeded by Thomas Hollway
