= Horace Petty =

Australian politician

Sir Horace Rostill Petty (25 March 1904 – 16 February 1982) was an Australian politician.

Petty was born in Richmond to wood block engraver Frederick Charles Petty and Alice Maud Rostill. He attended University High School and then the University of Melbourne, where he received a Bachelor of Commerce. On 22 February 1930 he married Mary Margaret Anastasia Watt. He worked for the Argus as a circulation manager, and during World War II served with the AIF. After the war he became a newsagent at Toorak; he was also an early member of the Liberal Party, and served on Prahran City Council from 1949 to 1964 (as mayor from 1951 to 1952).

In 1952 Petty was elected to the Victorian Legislative Assembly as the Liberal and Country Party member for Toorak. On 8 June 1955 he was appointed Minister for Housing, adding Immigration the following year; he exchanged Housing for Public Works in 1961. In 1964 he retired from politics and was appointed Victoria's Agent General in London until 1969 for which he was appointed a Knight Bachelor. Sir Horace had 4 children Joan, John, James and Jocelyn with his first wife. On 2 November 1959 he had married Beryl Anne Hoelter. Petty died in Richmond in 1982.

A Housing Commission of Victoria hi-rise estate in Prahran, a project he supported, the Horace Petty Estate was named in his honour.

Victorian Legislative Assembly
Preceded by Edward Reynolds	Member for Toorak; 1952–1964	Succeeded by Philip Hudson
