= 1924 Dalhousie state by-election =

A by-election for the seat of Dalhousie in the Victorian Legislative Assembly was held on Thursday 31 January 1924. The by-election was triggered by the death of Nationalist member Allan Cameron on 28 December 1923.

The Dalhousie by-election was the first to be held under the provisions of the Amending Electoral Act passed by the Victorian Parliament in December 1923, after a perceived abuse of electoral laws during the Daylesford by-election in August. Among other clauses, the new legislation required "authorised witnesses" to confirm the identity of electors applying for a postal vote.

== Candidates ==
Four nominations were received by noon on 18 January 1924. The candidates were Reg Pollard, a farmer and grazier from Woodend, for the Labor Party; Angus Stewart McNab, a farmer and grazier from Willowmavin, for the Nationalist Party; Gerald James McKenna, a farmer from Kyneton, for the Country Party; and John James McCarthy, a grazier from Kyneton, an independent candidate.

== Results ==
1924 Dalhousie state by-election
Party	Candidate	Votes	%	±%
Nationalist	Angus McNab	1,568	34.2	
Labor	Reg Pollard	1,522	33.3	
Country	Gerald McKenna	1,023	22.3	
Independent	John McCarthy	475	10.4	
Total formal votes		4,588	98.7	
Informal votes		62	1.3	
Turnout		4,650	71.5	
Two-party-preferred result
Labor	Reg Pollard	2,339	51.0	
Nationalist	Angus McNab	2,249	49.0	
Labor gain from Nationalist		Swing	N/A	
