= Walter Reddrop =

Australian cricketer

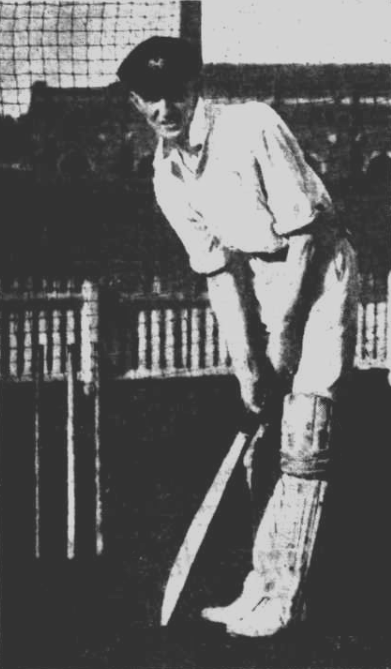

Personal information
- Born: 9 September 1901; Kyneton, Australia
- Died: 31 March 1983 (aged 81); Melbourne, Australia

Domestic team information
- Years: Team
- 1927-1929: Victoria
- Source: Cricinfo, 21 November 2015

Walter Reddrop (9 September 1901 – 31 March 1983) was an Australian cricketer. He played two first-class cricket matches for Victoria between 1927 and 1929.

== See also ==
- List of Victoria first-class cricketers
