= Kyneton Post Office =

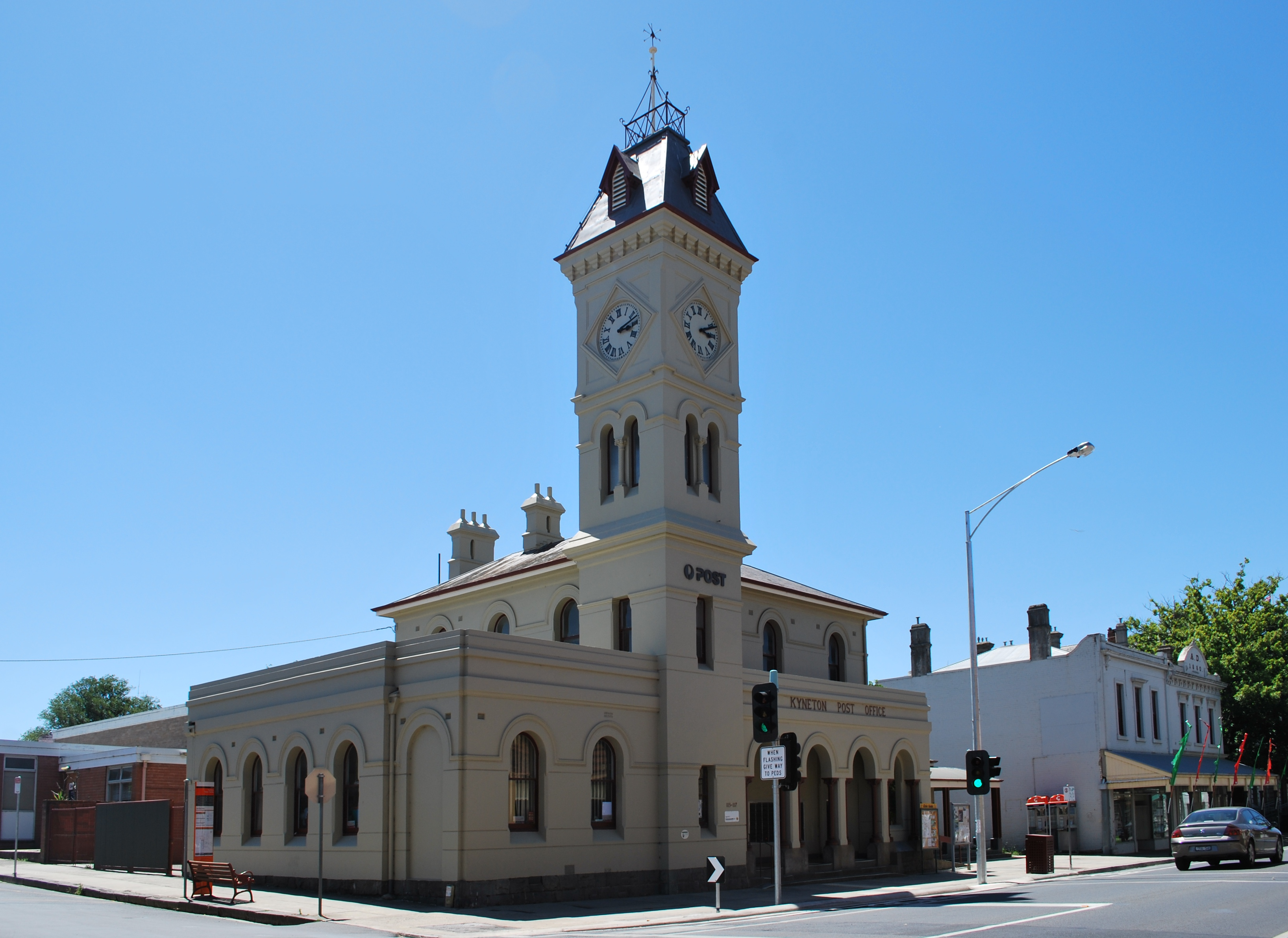

- Location within Victoria
- 37.2478°S 144.4532°E
- Location: 113 Mollison Street, Kyneton, Victoria, Australia

Commonwealth Heritage List
- Official name: Kyneton Post Office
- Type: Listed place (Historic)
- Designated: 8 November 2011
- Reference no.: 106133

Kyneton Post Office is a heritage-listed post office at 113 Mollison Street, Kyneton, Victoria, Australia. It was designed by Peter Kerr of the colonial Public Works Department and built in 1870–71. It was added to the Australian Commonwealth Heritage List on 8 November 2011.

== History ==
The Kyneton Post Office was constructed in 1870–71. The need for a new building was brought to the attention of the authorities by the agitation of local residents in May 1869, however, the Postmaster General responded in November of that year that there was no possibility that a new building would be constructed. This decision was altered in 1870, with the Shire Council being advised of the intention to build a new post office. Further local agitation, led by prominent residents the Hon. William Henry Fancourt Mitchell and Martin McKenna MLA, pressed for the inclusion of a clock tower in the building's design. After a number of deputations to the Postmaster General a decision was made to include the clock tower, providing that all additional costs above £1,700 were met by local residents and the Shire Council. The new post office was finished in December 1871, complete with a four-dial clock, made by Charles Prebble, a Kyneton watch and clock maker and jeweller.

The building underwent unidentified improvement works in 1878 and 1881, and a new telegraph room in the building opened in 1885. An additional single-storey bay was constructed c. 1893 to south side of original building and building lit with kerosene lamps. (It is possible this stage of works was actually completed in 1885 as part of the new telegraph room facility). Kerosene lamps were replaced by gas fittings in 1895.

In c. 1910s–20s, the 1890s single-storey bay was further added to, extending the building alignment to southern boundary and losing the original southern garden setting. The skillion roof form of the loggia was altered to a parapet form.

Between the 1940s and 1960s, it underwent phases of general refurbishment of the building including lighting, strapped plaster ceilings at ground floor level, acoustic ceilings at first floor level; construction of first floor amenities area north of main stair; alterations to door opening from first floor stair hall to front room; construction of timber-framed partition to create passage to clock tower access at first floor level; fire escape stair constructed in rear yard. The northern bay of the loggia was infilled and incorporated into the internal space at some stage prior to 1957.

An automatic telephone exchange was constructed in the rear yard c. 1968. In c. 1975, the postal and telephone functions area was subdivided and private letter boxes were installed in the front loggia. A disabled access ramp at the northern end of the loggia was constructed c. 1980s, with removal of the loggia infill.

Construction of na ew free-standing private letter box building to north of main building took place in 1990, including covered link to original north side entrance. In 1997, the post shop was refurbished, including new display units, angled counters, lighting, carpet.

== Description ==
Kyneton Post Office is at 113 Mollison Street, Kyneton, comprising the whole of Lot 1 LP218661.

The large rectangular site is located in Kyneton's main civic and commercial precinct at the prominent intersection of Mollison and Jennings streets. The surrounding streetscape reflects the town's mid-nineteenth century origins and the influence of gold on the subsequent development of the place. Limited redevelopment of the area since the turn of the twentieth century has maintained a strong heritage character. The adjoining sections of Mollison Street contain the Shire Hall, National Bank and Bank of Victoria (all 1870s) and the Bank of New South Wales (1880s and 1900s). The original site has been subdivided with the post office located on the eastern half, fronting Mollison Street and the 1960s telephone exchange occupying the western portion, fronting Jennings Street.

The rear yard, located between the post office and the exchange to the west, is concrete paved with vehicular access from Jennings Street. The yard is screened by a non-original concrete brick wall and steel gates and contains a small free-standing store and bicycle shed at the northwest corner. Originally landscaped as the post master's private yard, the area to the north of the original building was developed in 1990 with the construction of a single-storey brick building providing private letter boxes.

The original post office and residence component is constructed to the eastern Mollison Street boundary alignment which was extended southwards in two phases (c.1893 and 1910s–20s) to the Jennings Street boundary with a parapeted single-storey form. The square clock tower element marks the original southeast corner of the building. The principal double storey wing extends parallel to Mollison Street with the original single-storey service wing forming a T-shaped plan towards the centre of the site. The asymmetrical double-storey postal wing is the principal element in the composition, and is screened at street level by a (now parapeted) four-bay loggia. The main roof is hipped slate and is complemented by a mansard clock tower roof which retains original cast iron widow's walk and flagpole. The main entrance to the building is from the loggia via the ground level of the clock tower which contains wrought iron gates with narrow slot openings on all visible faces at the ground and first levels. Above this level are paired arched lancet openings in each elevation of the third level and clock faces at the fourth level. Each face of the mansard roof is punctuated by a small louvered gablet. Simple struck and moulded string courses define the walls throughout the building and the lines of the 1890s and 1920s additions to the south are reflected in the later loggia parapet. Fenestration throughout is regular and repetitive with single window openings with arched heads and moulded archivolts.

In plan form, the post office has three main sections which relate to the original design for a combined post office and residence, augmented by a fourth section which comprises the two additions to the southern side. The entrance provides access to the main post shop area (1880s addition, former telegraph room?). To the north of this, within the original building, are the mail room and various sorting areas and staff offices located in what appears to have been the original post and telegraph offices which would have been served by windows opening to the public loggia. To the west of this wing is the main stair hall, which is accessed via the original private side entrance, and further west is the original service wing which now contains a lunch room, contractors' room and store. It would appear that some alterations have occurred around the side entrance at both levels in order to accommodate the later first floor amenities. The main stair provides access to the first floor residence which appears to have contained a large sitting room and two or three bedrooms, one of which has been subdivided to provide a separate passage to the clock tower. To the north of the main stair is a non-original toilet block.

The building's frame is made of load-bearing masonry construction with timber-framed floor and roof structure. The external walls are of solid brick construction with rendered finish on rock-faced bluestone plinth with tooled margins; various tooled and moulded course lines which extend continuously at impost level into simply moulded archivolts. The internal walls are hard plastered and painted brickwork to external and partition walls; some areas have moulded dado lines. The floors are timber boards on timber-framed structure; Victorian profile moulded timber skirting boards, and the ceilings are lathe and plaster with square set cornice [and possibly various moulded cornices and ceiling roses. The roof is hipped with slate finish to principal building and kitchen wing, minimal eaves overhang, rendered brick chimneys with moulded caps; mansard roof form to clock tower with bracketed cornice, cast iron widows' walk and flagpole.

Other building features include the four-arched arcade loggia with skillion roof form finished with corrugated galvanised iron roofing; cast iron Corinthian order pilasters to loggia on sawn bluestone plinths; Four clock faces and mechanism manufactured by Charles Prebble; timber post and picket fences; round-arched timber-framed double-hung sash windows and four-panelled timber doors throughout; moulded timber architraves; dressed bluestone thresholds; polished timber stair and balustrade.

== Condition ==
Externally, Kyneton Post Office's ability to demonstrate its original design is generally very good with regard to the external form and fabric, despite a number of stages of alteration (dating from very early in the building's history).

Internally, the building's intactness has been somewhat reduced owing to changes in program and building use. These are manifested in alterations to the plan form and general refurbishment in fabric such as renewal of finishes, replacement or concealment of original ceilings, removal of fireplaces and fittings.

Externally and internally, the condition of the building is generally sound with no major structural defects visible, however original fabric is being impacted on by mechanical damage throughout the mail sorting and delivery areas and falling damp and pigeon damage in the southern parts of the first floor areas. The provision of mechanical services from the plant through the mail sorting area is intrusive. The roof space and clock tower were not inspected.

== Heritage listing ==
Kyneton Post Office was listed on the Australian Commonwealth Heritage List on 8 November 2011 with the following rationale:

The form, scale and quality of the Kyneton Post Office, constructed on a prominent corner site in the central commercial precinct in 1870–71, emphasises its status as an essential element in the communications of the broader district at a time when Kyneton was an important regional centre in Victoria's central goldfields.

Despite alterations, Kyneton Post Office is a fine example of a mid-Victorian second generation combined post and telegraph office and residence. The broadly intact original form, fabric and planning including elements such as the colonnaded facade, private side porch and stair hall, kitchen wing and first floor rooms demonstrate the combined functionality of the building, although this has been diminished by later alterations. Stylistically, Kyneton Post Office is a handsome composition which is heightened by its imposing and well-embellished four level clock tower. Its bold massing and corner siting at the centre of Kyneton's civic precinct also contribute to its monumental expression. Architecturally, with the exception of the more elaborate clock tower, the form is a typical Commonwealth Department of Works response, one of the last under the aegis of William Wardell, to a substantial regional post office of the 1870s.

Centrally located on a prominent intersection in Mollison Street, the impressive post office building with its clock tower is a recognised local landmark within the main civic and commercial precinct of Kyneton, partnering with the nearby Shire Hall and four nineteenth century banks. The building also makes an important and harmonious contribution to the historic streetscape. Kyneton Post Office has additionally been an enduring and prominent component of the historic townscape for over 135 years, since the local community first agitated for its construction, and is a widely known and appreciated symbol identified with the town's origin and period of booming prosperity.

The curtilage includes the title block/allotment of the property.

The significant components of Kyneton Post Office include the main 1870–71 postal building and clock tower. The single-storey section of the building to the south, extended in c.1893 and again in 1910s–20s, is of contributory significance.
