= Wilfrid Nelson Isaac =

Jeweler, enameller, metalworker, art school director (1893–1972)

- Born: 30 March 1893; Kyneton, Victoria, Australia
- Died: 15 June 1972 (aged 79)
- Occupations: Jeweller, Enameller, Metalworker, Art school director
- Known for: Several public commissions for silver pieces, such as important trophies, and ecclesiastical item

Wilfrid Nelson Isaac (30 March 1893 – 15 June 1972) was a New Zealand jeweller, enameller, metalworker and art school director. He is known for several public commissions for silver pieces, such as important trophies, and ecclesiastical items. Trained in the Arts and Crafts movement, he often incorporated New Zealand's indigenous styles, elements and materials such as Maori and opals. He was born in Kyneton, Victoria, Australia.
