= Fiona Argyle =

Mayor of Nedlands
- In office June 2021 – July 2025
- Preceded by: Cilla de Lacy
- Succeeded by: None

Personal details
- Party: Liberal (since 2023)
- Website: www.fionaargyle.com

Fiona Argyle is an Australian local government politician, model, and journalist. She was the mayor of the City of Nedlands in Western Australia from June 2021 until the council was dismissed by Local Government Minister Hannah Beazley in July 2025. Initially unaligned politically, Argyle joined the Liberal Party in December 2023.

== Before politics ==
Argyle was born and educated in the Nedlands area. She is the great-granddaughter of Stanley Argyle, who was the premier of Victoria from 1932 to 1935.

Argyle was a model and worked as a journalist for the Australian Broadcasting Corporation (ABC). She caused controversy after photos of her in a news car were published in the Australian edition of FHM. In February 2000, Media Watch reported that the ABC had banned any further photo shoots.

In 2002, Argyle appeared in the pilot to Hook, Line and Stiletto, a fishing and lifestyle show, alongside Annalise Braakensiek and Kate James. The show was produced by Argyle's production company Takeoff TV. She took the show to the MIPTV Media Market in Cannes, France, in an attempt to get the show commissioned by a television network.

Argyle had relationships with Lachlan Murdoch, James Packer and Jason Donovan, before marrying Angus Miller and becoming an art curator for Australia's High Commission in Singapore.

Before her election to the City of Nedlands, Argyle was an online fashion retailer.

== Politics ==
Argyle ran as an independent for the electoral district of Nedlands in the March 2021 Western Australian state election, achieving 11 percent of the vote.

In February 2021, Cilla de Lacy, the mayor of the City of Nedlands in Perth's western suburbs, resigned sixteen months into her term. In her campaign for mayor, Argyle supported the creation of an "infrastructure tax" on high-density property developments. Argyle was elected to succeed de Lacy in June 2021, gaining 2,297 votes to defeat councillor Noel Youngman (1,721) and Deputy Mayor Leo McManus (1,277).

In October 2021, Argyle accused three Nedlands councillors of bullying, including Youngman.

In October 2023, Argyle was re-elected mayor, beating two other contenders: Noel Youngman and Ben Hodsdon. Elected politically unaligned, Argyle joined the Liberal Party in December 2023, which she said was in "loving memory" of her great-grandfather, Stanley Argyle. This created speculation that she would run for the electoral district of Nedlands for the party in the 2025 state election.

As mayor, Argyle has opposed the creation of parkland in an A-class reserve in Swanbourne for a proposed children's hospice. She personally funded a billboard advertisement on Stirling Highway opposing the parkland. The billboard read "Class 'A' reserves are for future generations ... HANDS OFF", and featured the City of Nedlands logo.

On 7 June 2025, four councillors resigned from the City of Nedlands: Ben Hodsdon, Noel Youngman, Hengameh Amiry and Fergus Bennett. Hodsdon cited the council's opposition to the Swanbourne children's hospice as a reason for his resignation. He claimed the council was "toxic and dysfunctional". This came after the resignation of Leo McManus in 2024 and Melanie Pollard in January 2025, leaving the council without a quorum. The same day, Argyle was interviewed on ABC Radio Perth, where she welcomed the resignations and declared it was a great day. She said that "if anyone accuses me of bad behaviour or defamation, I'll sue them, because I have been nothing but a good mayor." The council, including Argyle, were dismissed by Local Government Minister Hannah Beazley later that week, and replaced with three commissioners. Argyle has stated she will likely run for mayor in the October 2025 local government election if it were held. The state government has indicated it might delay the election in Nedlands to prevent the new council from being too similar to the previous one.

== Personal life ==
Argyle's daughter, Inez Miller is a swimmer.
