= Philip Hudson =

Australian politician

Philip Martin Hudson (16 October 1910 – 9 July 2002) was an Australian politician.

He was born in North Sydney to manufacturer Tom Johnstone Hudson and Edith Grace Dickison. He attended Melbourne Grammar School and began studying commerce at the University of Melbourne, but he did not complete this as he enlisted in the AIF in 1940, serving in the Middle East, New Guinea and Borneo. After the war he remained in the Citizen Military Forces, rising to the rank of major. On 20 July 1940, he married Hilary Rutherford Hay; they had two sons. From 1949, he was a director of Hudson Industries manufacturing firm, becoming managing director in 1952. He was also a director of the Eno Box Company from 1949. In 1964, he was elected to the Victorian Legislative Assembly as the Liberal and Country Party member for Toorak. His seat was abolished in 1967 and he retired after a single term. He retired from his business career in 1975 and became chairman of the Victorian League for Commonwealth Friendship, a position he held until 1977. During 1990-2000, he was president of the Barwon Heads branch of the Returned and Services League. Hudson died in 2002.

Victorian Legislative Assembly
Preceded by Horace Petty	Member for Toorak; 1964–1967	Abolished
