= Harry White (Australian politician) =

Australian politician

Harry Owen White (11 February 1898 – 2 October 1946) was an Australian politician. He was a United Australia Party member of the Victorian Legislative Assembly from 1932 to 1943, representing the electorate of Bulla and Dalhousie.

White was born in North Melbourne, and attended Ascot Vale State School. He served in the armed forces in World War I, initially with the Royal Australian Artillery at Queenscliff, and later in France with the siege battalion, where he transferred to the Royal Air Force and Australian Flying Corps. He subsequently worked as an engineer before entering politics.

White was elected to the Legislative Assembly at the 1932 state election, defeating incumbent Labor MP and future federal minister Reg Pollard. He was re-elected in 1935, 1937 and 1940, defeating future state MP Charlie Mutton on each occasion. White served as secretary to the parliamentary United Australia Party and as party whip both in government and in opposition from 1935 until 1940. He relinquished his parliamentary roles that year due to his service in World War II, in which he was attached to an armoured division. White ultimately attained the rank of major, but had a breakdown in health in 1943, and spent some months in a military hospital. He did not contest the 1943 state election, at which his seat was won by Reginald James of the rival conservative Country Party.

White donated the H. O. White Medal for the Riddell District Football Association best and fairest award in 1936 and 1937.

White died in October 1946, and was cremated at Fawkner Crematorium.

== Links ==
- 1935 - Riddell DFA Premiership Trophy. The H O White Cup

Victorian Legislative Assembly
Preceded by Reg Pollard	Member for Bulla and Dalhousie; 1932–1943	Succeeded by Reginald James
