= Norman Bayles =

Australian politician

Norman Bayles (1 February 1865 – 25 September 1946) was an Australian politician.

He was born in Prahran to merchant and politician William Bayles and Isobel Buist. He attended Toorak College and Scotch College before studying law at the University of Melbourne. He became a solicitor in 1887, working as a partner in Bayles, Hamilton and Wilks. On 18 February 1897 he married Marion Elizabeth Clarke; she died in 1915 and on 11 September 1917 he married Roma Mary Hill Neill, with whom he had one son. In 1906, he won a by-election for the Victorian Legislative Assembly seat of Toorak. He voted against the Bent government and served as a Liberal and later a Nationalist. Bayles retired in 1920 and died in Toorak in 1946.

Victorian Legislative Assembly
Preceded by George Fairbairn	Member for Toorak; 1906–1920	Succeeded by Stanley Argyle
