= Hugh Rawson =

American author and editor

Hugh Rawson (September 12, 1936 - June 1, 2013) was an American editor and author. He was the director of Penguin USA's reference books operations and, for 12 years, worked as the editor of the Bulletin of The Authors Guild. He wrote or co-wrote a dozen books, including Wicked Words: A Treasury of Curses, Insults, Put-Downs, and Other Formerly Unprintable Terms (1989), A Dictionary of Euphemisms & Other Doubletalk (1981), and The Oxford Dictionary of American Quotations (2005).

== Early life and education ==
Rawson was born on September 12, 1936. He was raised in Mamaroneck, New York with two sisters and a brother. His father was an editor, writer, and magician. Rawson was educated in the Rye Neck school system until he was a sophomore in high school. At the age of fifteen, he received a Ford Foundation scholarship to Yale University. He graduated from Yale in 1956. After college, he served in the United States Army Medical Corps for two years.

== Career ==
After the army, Rawson worked as a reporter for American Banker and as an editor for a weekly McGraw-Hill business magazine.

Later, he went into book publishing. He worked for Thomas Y. Crowell Co. where he ran the trade department until the company was sold. He worked various jobs for publishers and freelancing, before he became the director of Penguin USA's reference books operation. For 12 years, he was editor of the Bulletin of The Authors Guild. He also worked as a columnist for American Heritage magazine, where he worked on American words and phrases and wrote a blog on language for The Huffington Post.

Rawson wrote and co-wrote more than a dozen books, most of them involving language and speech. They included five dictionaries of quotations that he co-wrote with his wife.

Shortly before he died, Rawson worked for a year as the assistant of William Safire on the last edition of Safire's Political Dictionary.

== Reviews ==
About his book A Dictionary of Euphemisms & Other Doubletalk (1981), Newsday wrote "Rawson's book is one of those welcome works of scholarship which can be read just for a good time."

Of the book's introduction, the Mercury wrote it "is about as interesting and amusing as anything published lately.

While the Boston Globe wrote: "Hugh Rawson's entertaining, informative and wonderfully salutary dictionary of euphemisms is good both for reading and reference and is a monument to the power of denial in human affairs.... Perhaps the most important lesson to be learned from Rawson's dictionary is that the ultimate euphemism may be the word "euphemism" itself."

== Personal life and death ==
Rawson married journalist and environmentalist, Margaret Miner, in 1973.

Rawson died in 2013. He was survived by his wife and their two daughters.

== Books ==
- Rawson, Hugh, and Margaret Miner, eds. 2015. The Penguin Dictionary of Quotations from Shakespeare. London: Penguin Books Ltd. ISBN 9780140513479.
- Rawson, Hugh, and Margaret Miner. 2006. The Oxford Dictionary of American Quotations. 2nd ed. New York: Oxford University Press.
- Rawson, Hugh. Unwritten Laws: The Unofficial Rules of Life as Handed Down by Murphy and Other Sages. Edison, NJ: Castle Books, 2002.
- Rawson, Hugh, and Margaret Miner. 2000. The New International Dictionary of Quotations. 3rd ed. New York: Penguin. ISBN 9780451199638.
- Rawson, Hugh, and Margaret Miner, eds. 1997. American Heritage Dictionary of American Quotations. New York: Penguin. ISBN 9780670100026.
- Rawson, Hugh, and Margaret Miner. 1994. The New International Dictionary of Quotations. 2nd ed. New York: Penguin. ISBN 9780451175977.
- Rawson, Hugh. Devious Derivations: Popular Misconceptions, and More Than 1,000 True Origins of Common Words and Phrases. New York: Crown Publishers, 1994.
- Rawson, Hugh. A Dictionary of Invective: A Treasury of Curses, Insults, Put-Downs and Other Formerly Unprintable Terms from Anglo-Saxon Times to the Present. London: Robert Hale Ltd., 1991.
- Rawson, Hugh. Wicked Words: A Treasury of Curses, Insults, Put-Downs, and Other Formerly Unprintable Terms from Anglo-Saxon Times to the Present.New York: Crown Publishers, 1989.
- Miner, Margaret, and Hugh Rawson, eds. 1992. A Dictionary of Quotations from the Bible. New York: Penguin Random House Australia. ISBN 9780451165503.
- Rawson, Hugh, and Margaret Miner. 1988. The New International Dictionary of Quotations. 1st ed. New York: Penguin. ISBN 9780451151537.
- Rawson, Hugh. A Dictionary of Euphemisms & Other Doubletalk: Being a Compilation of Linguistic Fig Leaves and Verbal Flourishes for Artful Users of the English Language. New York: Crown Publishers, Inc., 1981.
- Krieghbaum, Hillier, and Hugh Rawson. An Investment in Knowledge: The First Dozen Years of the National Science Foundation's Summer Institutes Programs to Improve Secondary School Science and Mathematics Teaching, 1954–1965. New York: New York University Press, 1969.
