= Arthur Ireland =

Australian politician (1896-1989)

Arthur Ernest Ireland MBE (2 September 1896 – 24 July 1989) was an Australian politician.

He was born in East Doncaster to orchardist Elijah Ireland and Keziah Bowers. He attended the local state school and served during World War I as a lieutenant in the Australian Field Artillery. On his return he became an orchardist, and 21 February 1920 married Mabel Blanche Peter-Budge. He served on Doncaster & Templestowe City Council from 1922 to 1926 and from 1932 to 1962, serving four terms as president. In 1947 he was elected to the Victorian Legislative Assembly as the Liberal member for Mernda. He served until his defeat in 1952. Ireland was appointed a Member of the Order of the British Empire in 1968. He died in 1989.

Victorian Legislative Assembly
Preceded by Leslie Webster	Member for Mernda; 1947–1952	Succeeded by Edmund Morrissey
