= Margaret Miner =

American writer and environmentalist (1938–2024)

Margaret Miner (1938–2024) was an American writer, journalist, environmentalist, and consultant. She worked as a reporter early in career before becoming the executive director of the Roxbury Land Trust, Connecticut. She left the trust to become the executive director of Rivers Alliance of Connecticut in 1999, a role in which she served for 18 years. Miner sat on a number of boards and advocated for clean water, land conservation and affordable housing. In addition, she co-founded Our Towns for Sar-E-Pol, a charity to help women and children in Afghanistan, and co-wrote seven books. In 2016, she was awarded the Environmental Protection Agency's (EPA's) Lifetime Merit Award.

== Early life ==
Miner was born in New York City in 1938. She was the daughter of Worthington "Tony" Miner, a television director and producer and Frances Fuller, TV and stage actress. She was the great niece, through her mother, of the politician James F. Byrnes. Miner's brother was the director producer, Peter Miner and her niece is his daughter, Rachel Miner.

Miner studied at Brearley School in New York City and, later, graduated from New York University (NYU).

== Career ==
In her early career, Miner worked as a reporter, covering local issues for Voices newspaper. With her husband, she co-wrote five dictionaries of quotations.

For much of her career, she advocated for clean water and land conservation. First in the role of executive director, Roxbury Land Trust. Later, she became the executive director of the Rivers Alliance of Connecticut in 1999. She served in the role for 18 years. She was known for work in relation to Long Island Sound. After her retirement, she continued to serve the organisation as a consultant until her death. In 2016, she was awarded the Environmental Protection Agency's (EPA's) Lifetime Merit Award.

Miner also played a role in the adoption of Connecticut's first State Water Plan as a member of the state Water Planning Council. In 2019, she was awarded the council's Champion of Water Award. Miner also served as a member of the board of the Connecticut League of Conservation Voters, the Zoning Board of Appeals of Roxbury, and the Democratic Town Committee.

Miner was also the co-founder of the Our Towns for Sar-E-Pol, a charity to assist women and children in Afghanistan, in collaboration with Save the Children.

== Awards and honours ==
- Environmental Protection Agency Lifetime Merit Award
- First Champion of Water Award, Connecticut Water Policy Council
- Connecticut Women's Hall of Fame Honoree (2019)

== Personal life and death ==
She married the author, Hugh Rawson, in 1973. He predeceased her in 2013. The couple had two children. Her daughter, Catherine Rawson, is the executive director of Northwest Connecticut Land Conservancy.

Miner died on May 5, 2024, in Roxbury, Connecticut. She was 86.

The Rivers Alliance of Connecticut Margaret Miner Environmental Champion Award is given annually in her honour.

== Works ==
=== Books ===
- Rawson, Hugh, and Margaret Miner, eds. 2015. The Penguin Dictionary of Quotations from Shakespeare. London: Penguin Books Ltd. ISBN 9780140513479.
- Rawson, Hugh, and Margaret Miner. 2006. The Oxford Dictionary of American Quotations. 2nd ed. New York: Oxford University Press.
- Rawson, Hugh, and Margaret Miner. 2000. The New International Dictionary of Quotations. 3rd ed. New York: Penguin. ISBN 9780451199638.
- Rawson, Hugh, and Margaret Miner, eds. 1997. American Heritage Dictionary of American Quotations. New York: Penguin. ISBN 9780670100026.
- Rawson, Hugh, and Margaret Miner. 1994. The New International Dictionary of Quotations. 2nd ed. New York: Penguin. ISBN 9780451175977.
- Young, Stuart H., Bruce S. Dobozin, and Margaret Miner. 1992. Allergies: The Complete Guide to Diagnosis, Treatment, and Daily Management. New York: Penguin. ISBN 9780451175977.
- Miner, Margaret, and Hugh Rawson, eds. 1992. A Dictionary of Quotations from the Bible. New York: Penguin Random House Australia. ISBN 9780451165503.
- Rawson, Hugh, and Margaret Miner. 1988. The New International Dictionary of Quotations. 1st ed. New York: Penguin. ISBN 9780451151537.

=== Articles ===
- Miner, Margaret. 2012. "Neglected State Property Imperils Streams." Hartford Courant, July 26, 2012, A15.
- Wildman, Laura, and Margaret Miner. 2008. "How to Keep Flood Bailouts at Bay." Hartford Courant, October 12, 2008, C03.
- Brown, Lori, and Margaret Miner. 2007. "Watershed Integrity Shouldn't Be for Sale." Hartford Courant, August 20, 2007, A07.
