= Electoral district of Bulla and Dalhousie =

Former state electoral district of Victoria, Australia

Coordinates: 37°10′S 144°45′E

Bulla and Dalhousie Victoria—Legislative Assembly
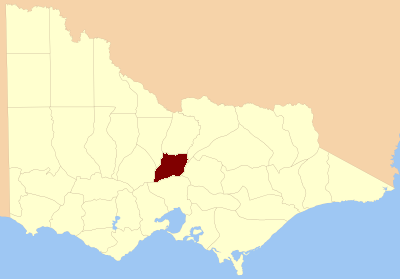
- County of Dalhousie, approx. location of district
- State: Victoria
- Created: 1927
- Abolished: 1945
- Demographic: Rural

Bulla and Dalhousie (also referred to as Bulla-Dalhousie) was an electoral district of the Victorian Legislative Assembly. It was created in 1927 with the merging of the previous districts of Bulla and Dalhousie, and was abolished in 1945, with most of the territory going into the new Mernda seat. It was a rural electorate on the outskirts of Melbourne, and at its abolition included Broadmeadows, Gisborne, Lancefield and Sunbury.

== Members for Bulla and Dalhousie ==
Member	Party	Term
Reg Pollard	Labor	1927–1932
Harry White	United Australia	1932–1943
Reginald James	Country	1943–1944
Leslie Webster	Country	1944–1945

== See also ==
- Electoral districts of Victoria
