= Electoral district of Mernda =

Former state electoral district of Victoria, Australia

Mernda Victoria—Legislative Assembly
- State: Victoria
- Created: 1945
- Abolished: 1955
- Namesake: Suburb of Mernda
- Demographic: Outer metropolitan
- Coordinates: 37°36′S 145°05′E

The Electoral district of Mernda was an electoral district of the Victorian Legislative Assembly. Mernda was created in the 1945 redistribution, created from the abolished Electoral district of Bulla and Dalhousie.

== Members ==
Member	Party	Term
Leslie Webster	Country	1945–1947
Arthur Ireland	Liberal	1947–1952
Edmund Morrissey	Labor	1952–1955
Edmund Morrissey	Labor (Anti-Communist)	1955

== See also ==
- Parliaments of the Australian states and territories
- List of members of the Victorian Legislative Assembly
