= Reginald James =

Australian politician

Reginald Alfred John James (1 June 1893 – 27 September 1944) was an Australian politician. He was a Country Party member of the Victorian Legislative Assembly from 1943 to 1944, representing the electorate of Bulla and Dalhousie.

James was born in America, and lived his early years in Swan Hill. He served in World War I in France with the 29th battalion, and returned after the war to his family's dairy farming and grazing property at Garfield. He also later owned a chain of milk bars in Melbourne. James was well known in the dairy industry around Australia, and served as secretary and official advocate of the Milk Producers' Association from its inception until his death. He also served as editor of the Milk Producer publication, founder and honorary secretary of the Metropolitan Milk Council Free Milk Scheme, secretary of the Milk Standard Institute, president of the Gippsland United Progress Associations, and as a member of the council of the Victorian Chamber of Agriculture.

James first attempted to enter politics at a 1929 by-election, when he contested the seat of Gippsland West as a Nationalist candidate. He ran what was widely touted as a strong campaign, but lost to Country Party candidate Matthew Bennett. He again contested the seat at the 1929 state election, but lost to Bennett once more.

James won election on his third attempt at the 1943 state election, when as a Country Party candidate, he won the United Australia Party seat of Bulla and Dalhousie by a margin of 933 votes. His political career was to be short-lived, however, as he died suddenly in office on 27 September 1944. James had finished speaking to an electoral redistribution bill in parliament, left the chamber, and collapsed and died in the lobby of Parliament House before medical assistance could be rendered. He was cremated at Springvale Crematorium. He was succeeded at the subsequent by-election by Country Party Leslie Webster, who had served with James on the executive of the Milk Producers' Association.

He was married with three children, one of whom was killed in a Royal Australian Air Force training accident in November 1942.

Parliament of Victoria
| Preceded by Harry White | Member for Bulla and Dalhousie; 1943–1944 | Succeeded by Leslie Webster |
