= Robert Bell Hamilton =

Australian politician

Member of the Victorian Legislative Assembly for Toorak
- In office 10 November 1945 – 15 May 1948
- Preceded by: Harold Thonemann
- Succeeded by: Edward Reynolds

Personal details
- Born: 20 October 1892 East Melbourne, Victoria
- Died: 14 May 1948 (aged 55) Mornington, Victoria, Australia
- Resting place: Springvale Botanical Cemetery
- Party: Liberal Party
- Spouse: Olive Berry (m. 1920)
- Profession: Architect
- Committees: Library Committee, Public Works Committee

Military service
- Allegiance: Australia
- Branch/service: Australian Imperial Force
- Unit: 14th Battalion

Robert Bell Hamilton (20 October 1892 – 15 May 1948) was a notable Australian architect and also Member of the Legislative Assembly for the State electoral district of Toorak in Victoria.

== Biography ==
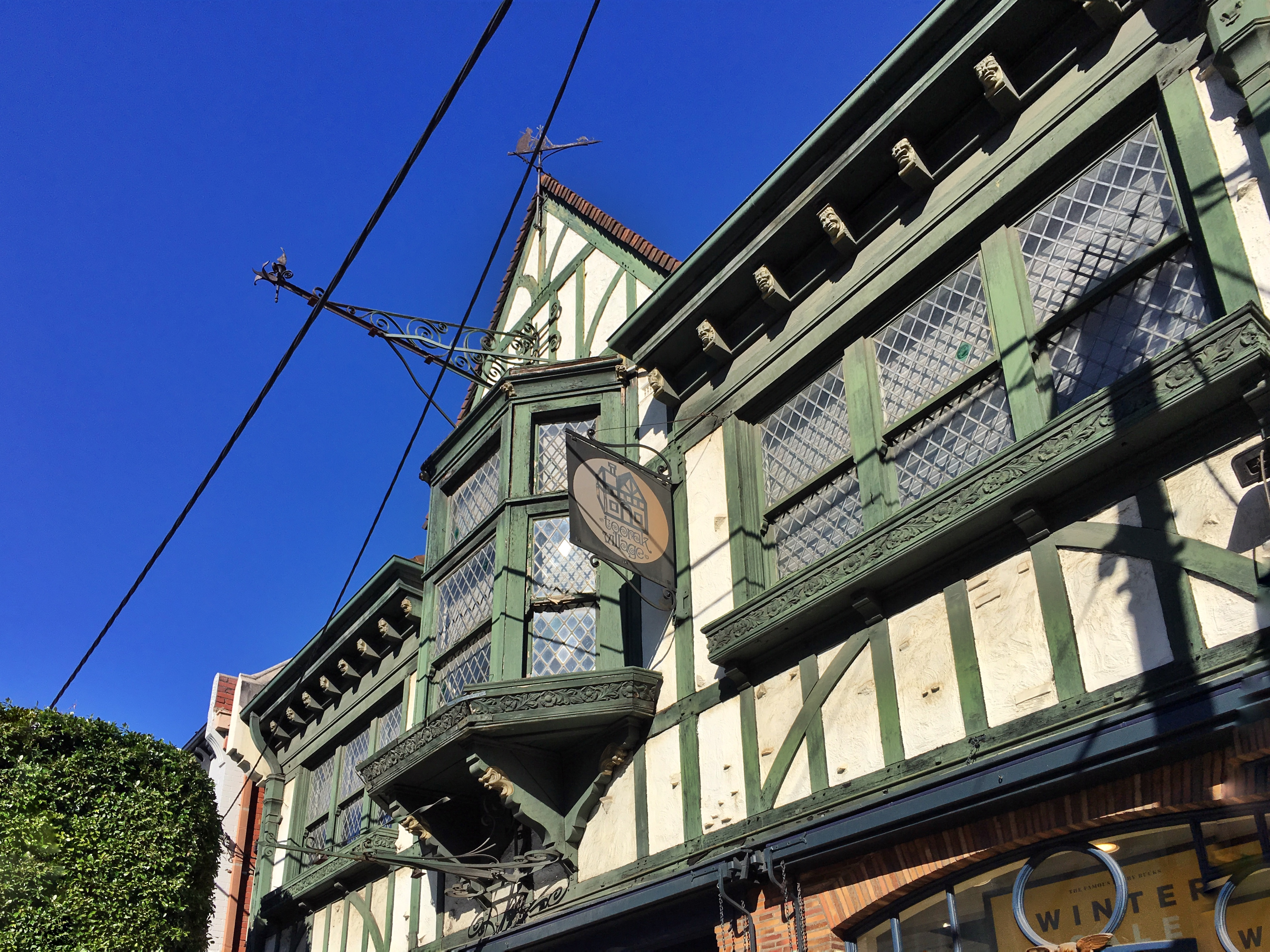
William Ford Chemist, Toorak Road, 1932

Robert Bell Hamilton began his architectural career articled to RB Whitaker, and then moved to Klingender & Alsop. After serving in WW1, he studied further in London, then worked in India. Returning in 1921, he formed a partnership with Klingender, which lasted util 1925, then set up on his own. By about 1930 he was a successful designer of houses in the wealthier suburbs in and around Toorak, and then expanded into shops and especially blocks of flats as well. He was Victoria's foremost practitioner of the inter-war Old English/Tudor Revival style during the 1930s. Hamilton aided in the design, along with the firm Prevost Synnot and Rewald, of Bruce Manor (1927) in Frankston, for then Australian Prime Minister Stanley Bruce; added to the Victorian Heritage Register in 2004. For his contribution to Victorian architecture Hamilton was appointed as a Fellow of the Royal Victorian Institute of Architects in 1931.

Hamilton served as a Councillor on Prahran City Council for Toorak Ward and then Mornington Shire Council. He later served as President of Mornington Shire Council, and subsequently became the Member for Toorak for the Liberal and Country Party in the November 1945 election that saw the Labor Party win a small majority over their coalition counterparts. During his short time in Parliament, Hamilton sat on the Public Works Committee and the Library Committee.

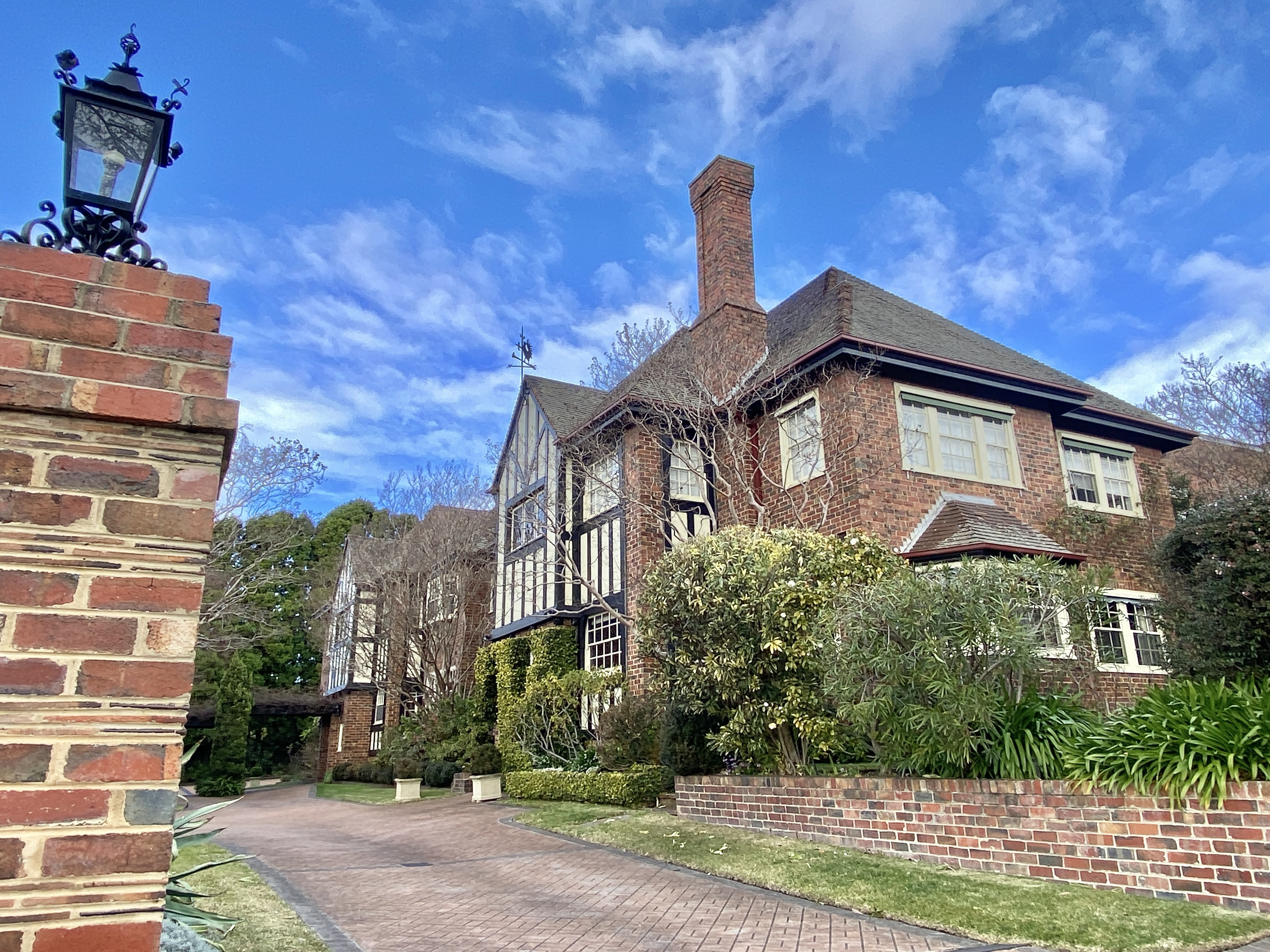
Denby Dale Flats, Kooyong, 1938

Hamilton died in 1948 at Mornington Nursing Hospital before serving a full-term in office. In an obituary published in The Standard, the then President of Mornington Shire Council wrote:

His work and his planning for the future of Mornington have put us in his debt, and his name will be remembered because his energy and his ideas have been given for the future and the advancement of our district...I pay homage to Robert Bell Hamilton, a citizen with true public spirit and a man who discharged all obligations of friendship.

The by-election triggered by his death, held in June 1948, saw the re-election of a Liberal and Country Party member, Edward Reynolds.

== Major works ==
- Telgai (1925) – 4 Struan Street, Toorak; Hamilton's own first house; greatly expanded by Bell for a new owner in 1932
- House (1926) – 13 Myamyn Street, Armadale
- Wiltondale (1929) – 25 Heyington Place, Toorak
- House (1930) – 12 Macquarie Rd, Toorak
- House (1930) – 9 Henderson Avenue, Malvern
- Haddon Hall flats (1932) – 405 Toorak Road, Toorak
- William Ford Chemist (1932) – 476 Toorak Road, Toorak
- Sunleigh Lodge (1933) – 5 Russell St, Toorak
- Burnham Flats (1933) – 14 Grange Road, Toorak
- Moore Abbey Flats (1933) – Marne Street, South Yarra
- House (c. 1933) – 61 St Georges Road, Toorak
- Mayfield Flats (1934) – Murphy Street, South Yarra
- Stonehaven Flats (c. 1935) – 692 Orrong Road, Toorak
- High Clere (c. 1935) – 2 Bays Crescent, (was 447 Esplanade), Mt Martha, as Hamilton's family holiday house
- Taunton Flats (1936) – at 520 Toorak Road, Toorak
- Denby Dale flats (1937–8) – 420-426 Glenferrie Road, Kooyong
- Langham Court Flats (1936) – cnr Domain Road and Walsh Street, South Yarra
- Gowrie Court maisonettes (1940) – 716 Orrong Road, Toorak

Victorian Legislative Assembly
Preceded by Harold Thonemann	Member for Toorak; 1945–1948	Succeeded by Edward Reynolds
