= List of mayors of Nedlands =

The City of Nedlands is a local government area in Perth, Western Australia. It was established in 1893 as the Claremont Road District, with a chairman elected by the road board members as its leader. Claremont split away to become the Municipality of Claremont (now the Town of Claremont) in 1898. The road district was renamed to the Nedlands Road District in 1931. It became a municipality in 1956, now called the Municipality of Nedlands, with a mayor as its leader. Following the passage of the Local Government Act 1960, it became the City of Nedlands.

== Claremont Road District ==
Chairman	Term	Ref
A. F. Thomson	17 May 1893 – 31 December 1894	
A. B. Kidson	31 December 1894 – 24 April 1895	
H. G. Stirling	29 May 1895 – 1902	
F. Mason	1903–1904	
F. W. Martin	1905	
T. H. Cooper	1906–1910	
W. S. Finey	1911–1912	
R. W. Everett	1913	
F. W. Martin	1914–1915	
J. R. Kinninmont	1916	
T. J. Myers	1917–1920	
J. L. Lapsley	1921–1922	
W. S. Finey	1923	
H. M. Carpenter	1924	
A. Terelinck	1925–1927	
Clifford Sadlier	1928–1929	
J. Leckie	1930	

== Nedlands Road District ==
Chairman	Term	Ref
J. Leckie	1931–1933	
A. H. Bulley	1934	
A. Bennett	1935–1937	
W. C. Brown	1938	
J. Allen	1939	
J. C. Smith	1940	
W. G. Kensitt	1941	
T. F. W. Kendall	1942	
T. G. Heydon	1943	
F. C. Bull	1944	
J. Allen	1945	
W. C. Brown	1946	
R. G. Missen	1947	
T. F. W. Kendall	1948	
W. G. Kensitt	1949	
J. C. Smith	1950	
T. G. Heydon	1951	
R. G. Missen	1952	
R. E. Moyle	1953	
W. K. Kemp	1954	
H. S. Leckie	1955	

== Municipality of Nedlands ==
Mayor	Term	Ref
J. C. Smith	1956–1959	

== City of Nedlands ==
Mayor	Term	Notes	Ref
J. C. Smith	1959–1964	Resigned on 17 April 1964	
R. Holmes	1964–1966		
J. C. Smith	1966–1979		
D. C. Cruickshank	1979–1992		
C. E. Barns	1992–1995		
No mayor	1995	City was governed commissioner J. R. Gilfellon	
C. E. Barns	1995–1999		
J. M. Paterson	1999–2003		
L. G. Taylor	2003–2007		
S. A. Froese	2007–2011		
R. M. C. Hipkins	2011–2019		
Cilla M. de Lacy	2019–2021	Resigned in February 2021	
Fiona Argyle	2021–2025	Council dissolved by Local Government Minister	
No mayor	2025	City was governed commissioner David Caddy	
