= Harold Thonemann =

Australian politician

Harold Eric Thonemann (28 October 1890 – 5 August 1962) was an Australian politician.

He was born in St Kilda to sharebroker Frederick Emil Thonemann and Louisa Margaret Service, daughter of Premier James Service. He attended Melbourne Grammar School and served with the Royal Field Artillery during World War I. After the war he became a sharebroker, and on 20 June 1922 married Nora Kate (Tui) Shields, with whom he had two children. He was a member of the Melbourne Stock Exchange from 1927 and director of a number of companies; he also owned extensive grazing land, mostly in the Northern Territory. In 1941 he won a by-election for the Victorian Legislative Assembly seat of Toorak. In 1945, the local Liberal branch declined to endorse either Thonemann or preselection opponent Robert Hamilton; both contested the election, with Hamilton emerging successful. Thonemann died in Toorak in 1962.

Victorian Legislative Assembly
Preceded by Stanley Argyle	Member for Toorak; 1941–1945	Succeeded by Robert Hamilton
