= Electoral district of Dalhousie =

Former state electoral district of Victoria, Australia

Coordinates: 37°10′S 145°15′E

Dalhousie Victoria—Legislative Assembly
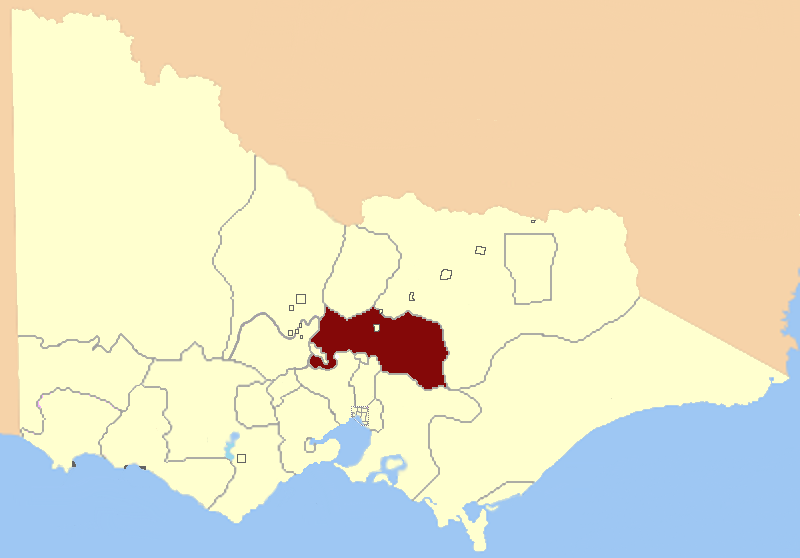
- Dalhousie, 1859
- State: Victoria
- Dates current: 1859–1889, 1904–1927
- Demographic: Rural

Dalhousie was an electoral district of the Legislative Assembly in the Australian state of Victoria from 1859 to 1927. It was based in north-western Victoria. The district had been named Electoral district of Anglesey. The district of Dalhousie was defined in the 1858 Electoral Act as :

THE ELECTORAL DISTRICT OF DALHOUSIE.

ANGLESEY. Bounded on the west by part of the eastern boundary of the County of Dalhousie, namely, by the River Goulburn from the confluence of Hughes's Creek to the confluence of Dabyminga Creek; thence by Dabyminga Creek to its source in the Great Dividing Range; on the south by the Great Dividing Range to the main source of the River Goulburn; on the east by the range dividing the waters of the main source of the Goulburn and Big Rivers from those of the Rubicon and Snod-por-dock Creek northward to Mount Torbrick; thence by Jerusalem Creek to its confluence with the River Goulburn; thence by the River Goulburn to the confluence of the River Delatite; thence by the River Delatite and its north-west arm to the Dividing Range between the last named arm and Septimus Creek; and on the north by that range to the source of Hughes's Creek; and thence by Hughes's Creek to its confluence with the River Goulburn, excepting the country included in the Boroughs of Seymour and Avenel ... DALHOUSIE. Commencing at the junction of the Rivers Campaspe and Coliban; thence by a line south-easterly to the source of the Mclvor or Patterson's Creek; thence by a line north-east to the confluence of Hughes's Creek with the River Goulburn; on the east by the River Goulburn until it joins the Dabyminga Creek, by that creek to its source in the Dividing Range; on

the south by the Dividing Range to the source of the River Coliban; and on the west by the last mentioned river to its junction with the River Campaspe, being the commencing point, excepting the country included in the electoral districts of the Kyneton Boroughs, Murray Boroughs, and Kilmore.

== Members for Dalhousie ==
Snodgrass was member for Anglesey 1856 to 1859

First incarnation 1859–1889
Member	Term
Peter Snodgrass	Oct. 1859 – Aug. 1864
George John Sands	Nov. 1864 – July 1867
Charles Duffy	Aug. 1867 – Mar. 1874
John Gavan Duffy	May 1874 – Feb. 1886
George John Sands	Mar. 1886 – Mar. 1887
John Gavan Duffy	June 1887^{#} – Mar. 1889

Anglesey existed in a second incarnation from 1889 to 1904.

Second incarnation 1904–1927
Member	Party	Term
Reginald Argyle	Unaligned	1904–1914
Allan Cameron	Liberal	1914–1917
Allan Cameron	Nationalist	1917–1923
Reg Pollard	Labor	1924^{#}–1927

^{#} = by-election

The new Electoral district of Bulla and Dalhousie was created in 1927 when Dalhousie was abolished. Pollard was member for Bulla and Dalhousie 1927–1932.
