= Reg Pollard (politician) =

Australian politician

The Honourable Reg Pollard
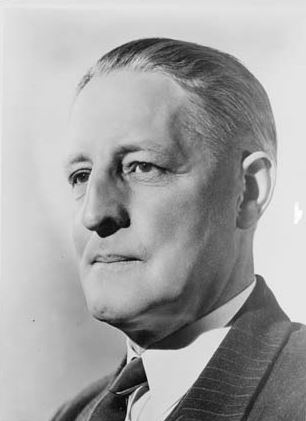

Minister for Commerce and Agriculture
- In office 1 November 1946 – 19 December 1949
- Prime Minister: Ben Chifley
- Preceded by: William Scully
- Succeeded by: John McEwen

Member of the Australian Parliament for Lalor
- In office 10 December 1949 – 26 November 1966
- Preceded by: New seat
- Succeeded by: Mervyn Lee

Member of the Australian Parliament for Ballaarat
- In office 23 October 1937 – 10 December 1949
- Preceded by: Archibald Fisken
- Succeeded by: Alan Pittard

Member of the Victorian Legislative Assembly for Dalhousie (until 1927) Bulla and Dalhousie (from 1927)
- In office 1924–1932
- Preceded by: Allan Cameron
- Succeeded by: Harry White

Personal details
- Born: 31 October 1894 Castlemaine, Victoria, Australia
- Died: 24 August 1981 (aged 86) Gisborne, Victoria, Australia
- Party: Australian Labor Party
- Spouse: Elsie Bowman Hodges
- Occupation: Dairy farmer

Reginald Thomas Pollard (31 October 1894 – 24 August 1981) was an Australian politician. He was a member of the Australian Labor Party (ALP) and served in the Victorian Legislative Assembly (1924–1932) and House of Representatives (1937–1966). He was Minister for Commerce and Agriculture (1946–1949) in the Chifley government.

== Early life ==
Pollard was born in Castlemaine, Victoria and educated at Woodend State School, West Melbourne Technical School and Workingmen's College. He worked as an agricultural labourer near Werribee and from 1912 to 1915 as a fitter in Melbourne. During World War I he served in the first Australian Imperial Force the 6th Battalion from October 1915 in Egypt and France and was promoted to Second Lieutenant. He was wounded in 1918 and invalidated home. He became a soldier settler in Woodend as a dairy farmer. He married Elsie Bowman Hodges in 1922 and they had two sons.

== State politics ==
Pollard founded the Woodend branch of the Australian Labor Party. He was elected to the Victorian Legislative Assembly seat of Dalhousie in a 1924 by-election, and represented the seat of Bulla and Dalhousie from 1927 until his defeat in the 1932 election. He was assistant Minister of Agriculture from December 1929 to May 1932. He ran unsuccessfully for the federal seat of Gippsland at the 1934 election and the state seat of Castlemaine and Kyneton in 1935.

== Federal politics ==
Pollard was elected to the Australian House of Representatives seat of Ballaarat at the 1937 election. He held it until the 1949 election, when he transferred to the seat of Lalor. This was after a redistribution when parts of the seat of Ballaarat, including Woodend where Pollard was based in, had been transferred to the seat of Lalor. He then held the seat of Lalor until he was defeated at the 1966 election.

While in federal parliament, he was appointed Minister for Commerce and Agriculture in the second Chifley Ministry in November 1946, but lost office with the defeat of the Chifley government at the 1949 election. As Minister, he introduced a scheme to stabilise the price of wheat paid to farmers.

Pollard died in Gisborne in August 1981, aged 86.

== Notes ==
Parliament of Victoria
Preceded by Allan Cameron	Member for Dalhousie; 1924–1927	Succeeded by Seat abolished
Preceded by New seat	Member for Bulla and Dalhousie; 1927–1932	Succeeded by Harry White
Parliament of Australia
Preceded by Archibald Fisken	Member for Ballaarat; 1937–49	Succeeded by Alan Pittard
New division	Member for Lalor; 1949–66	Succeeded by Mervyn Lee
Political offices
Preceded by William Scully	Minister for Commerce and Agriculture; 1946–49	Succeeded by John McEwen
