= Kyneton =

- Town
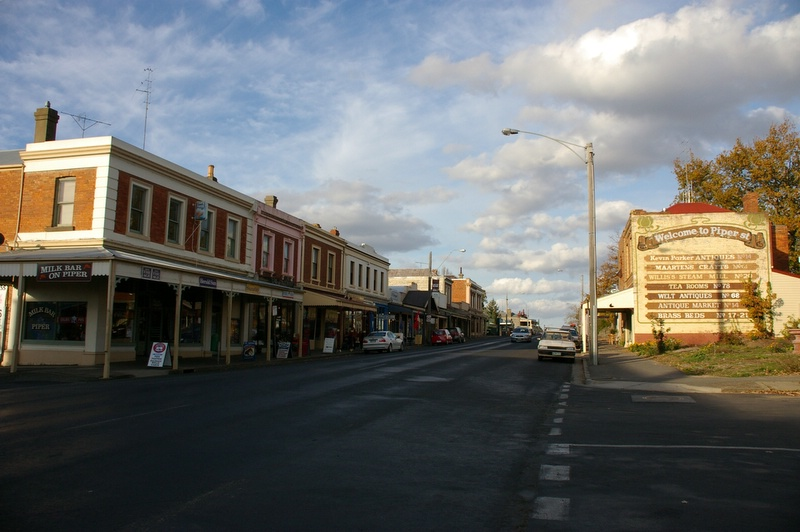
- Looking along Piper Street, Kyneton

- Interactive map of Kyneton
- Coordinates: 37°14′S 144°27′E
- Country: Australia
- State: Victoria
- LGA: Shire of Macedon Ranges
- Location: 86 km (53 mi) NW of Melbourne; 68 km (42 mi) S of Bendigo; 77 km (48 mi) NE of Ballarat; 37 km (23 mi) SE of Castlemaine
- Established: 1850

Government
  - State electorate: Macedon
  - Federal division: Bendigo

Area
  - Total: 97.9 km^{2} (37.8 sq mi)
- Elevation: 520 m (1,710 ft)

Population
  - Total: 7,513 (2021 census)
  - Density: 76.74/km^{2} (198.76/sq mi)
- Time zone: UTC+10 (AEST)
  - Summer (DST): UTC+11 (AEDT)
- Postcode: 3444
- County: Dalhousie
- Mean max temp: 18.5 °C (65.3 °F)
- Mean min temp: 5.6 °C (42.1 °F)
- Annual rainfall: 753.4 mm (29.66 in)
Localities around Kyneton
Malmsbury	Edgecombe	Sidonia
Lauriston	Kyneton	Pipers Creek
Spring Hill	Kyneton South	Pipers Creek

Kyneton (/ˈkaɪntən/ KYNE-tən) is a town in the Macedon Ranges region of central Victoria, Australia. The Calder Freeway bypasses Kyneton to the north and east.

The town has three main streets: Mollison Street, Piper Street and High Street. Piper Street has the oldest streetscape of these, and still has many of its original buildings. The railway station, about 86 kilometres (53 mi) from Melbourne on the Deniliquin railway line, is a terminus for two weekday peak-hour trains. The town is the council seat of the Shire of Macedon Ranges. At the 2021 census, Kyneton recorded a population of 7,513.

== History ==
The region is located on the border of Djadjawurrung and Taungurong country. Before British colonisation these Indigenous Australian people resided mostly along the Coliban and Campaspe Rivers. Village-like communities existed in particular in the area around the junction of these rivers. Large in-ground stone ovens which they used to cook meat and murnong were commonly found in the region.

Major Thomas Mitchell, New South Wales Surveyor-General crossed and named the Campaspe River near present-day Kyneton on his 1836 expedition.

Charles Ebden was the first British colonist to occupy the region that includes the site of Kyneton. On 26 May 1837, he established a sheep station which he called Carlsruhe 6 km south of what is now Kyneton. Thomas Walker, a Sydney businessman, walked from Sydney to Melbourne in 1837, recording the trip in a journal "A month in the Bush of Australia". Thomas Walker met Ebden in May 1837 on the journey south.

In June 1838 the Waterloo Plains massacre of 8–23 Djadjawurrung people occurred on the newly established Barfold sheep run north of Kyneton.

Unlike a majority of towns in the area, Kyneton predates the separation of the Port Phillip District from the Colony of New South Wales and the Victorian gold rushes, having been established in 1850, whereas separation occurred and the gold rushes started the year after. Construction of Kyneton's oldest surviving stone building, the Church of England Rectory, located at 61 Ebden Street, commenced in 1850 and is a rare surviving example of a pre-gold rush and pre-separation dwelling.

At this time, Kyneton was a growing rural centre, and served as a major stop for those heading to the gold rushes at Mount Alexander and Bendigo. The post office opened on 1 July 1843 as Mount Macedon and was renamed Kyneton on 1 January 1854.

Local government came to Kyneton with the proclamation of the Kyneton Municipal District in 1857. This body was short-lived, as it was amalgamated with the Carlsruhe, the Lauriston & Edgecombe, and the Tylden & Trentham Road Districts in December 1864 to form the Kyneton United Road District. The Kyneton United Road District was almost immediately redesignated as Kyneton Shire in January 1865. It absorbed part of Glenlyon Shire in 1873, Malmsbury Borough in 1915 and part of Ballan Shire in 1921. In 1995 Kyneton Shire was abolished by part being amalgamated with Creswick Shire, part of Daylesford & Glenlyon Shire and part of Talbot & Clunes Shire to form Hepburn Shire, and the remainder being amalgamated with Gisborne Shire, Newham & Woodend Shire and Romsey Shire to form Macedon Ranges Shire.

Joseph Furphy (aka Tom Collins) attended Kyneton primary school in the mid-1850s.

In November 1857, the humanitarian Caroline Chisholm moved her family to Kyneton, where her husband Archibald sat on the magistrates' bench and their two elder sons ran a store.

Kyneton Mounted Rifle Corps was formed in 1859, as one of the volunteer brigades set up when Britain was involved in wars in Afghanistan, Crimea and India. The Kyneton Mounted Rifle Corps was among the earliest in the colony of Victoria. The corps was later amalgamated in the 1880s to form the Victorian Mounted Rifles. Although the individual volunteer units had been disbanded by Federation (1901), many members became part of the 4th and 12th regiments of Light Horse at the Battle of Beersheba (1917) against Turkish troops of the Ottoman Empire.

Henry Gregory (1860–1940), Western Australian State and Federal politician, was born and educated in Kyneton.

Sir Stanley Argyle, Premier of Victoria 1932–35, was born in Kyneton in 1867 and the family lived at Rock House, a double fronted double story bluestone house that still stands to the west of the town on the banks of the Campaspe River.

Lieutenant-Colonel Geoffrey Hurry (1868–1951), Commander of the 38th Battalion AIF in France in 1918, was born and died in Kyneton. He was the Member for Bendigo in the Commonwealth Parliament from 1922 until 1929.

The Kyneton Courthouse tried Ned Kelly in 1870 for robbery under arms. This courthouse has since continued to function, although only as a magistrates' court on Mondays.

== Population ==
In the 2021 Census, there were 7,513 people in Kyneton. 79.5% of people were born in Australia. The next most common country of birth was England at 4.2%. 89.1% of people spoke only English at home. The most common responses for religion were No Religion 48.2%, Catholic 20.7% and Anglican 9.2%.

== Notable residents ==
- Stanley Argyle
- Warwick Armstrong
- Alexander Burton
- Ian Castles
- Joe Camilleri
- Robert Elliott (Victorian politician)
- Bill Farnan
- Alexander Fraser (Australian politician)
- Henry Gregory (politician)
- Rowland Holle
- Geoffry Hurry
- Polly Hurry
- Wilfrid Nelson Isaac
- Philip Le Couteur
- David Leahy
- Martin McKenna (politician)
- Tamra Mercieca
- Bob Morley
- Josephine Muntz Adams
- Walter Reddrop
- Frederick Shedden
- Clara Southern
- Syd Stirling
- Tom Sutherland (footballer)
- Brettena Smyth
- Henry Wells (general)
- H.A. Willis
- Caroline Chisholm (Humanitarian)

== Media ==
Kyneton's main locally produced newspaper is the Midland Express, which also serves the surrounding region. The town receives television from Mount Alexander, and is served by a community radio station, 100.7 Highlands FM, based in Woodend.

== Climate ==
Kyneton has a temperate mediterranean climate (Csb), with distinctly cold mornings in the summer. Cold fronts occur frequently throughout much of the year, and even in summer they are a fairly regular occurrence. Light snowfalls occur sporadically in the cooler months and sleet is a common feature.

Climate data for Kyneton (1887–1966, rainfall 1873–1969); 509 m AMSL; 37.25° S, 144.45° E
Month	Jan	Feb	Mar	Apr	May	Jun	Jul	Aug	Sep	Oct	Nov	Dec	Year
Mean daily maximum °C (°F)	27.2 (81.0)	26.7 (80.1)	23.6 (74.5)	18.3 (64.9)	13.9 (57.0)	10.7 (51.3)	10.0 (50.0)	11.6 (52.9)	14.9 (58.8)	18.1 (64.6)	21.8 (71.2)	25.0 (77.0)	18.5 (65.3)
Mean daily minimum °C (°F)	9.8 (49.6)	10.2 (50.4)	8.4 (47.1)	5.6 (42.1)	3.5 (38.3)	2.3 (36.1)	1.6 (34.9)	1.9 (35.4)	3.3 (37.9)	4.8 (40.6)	6.6 (43.9)	8.6 (47.5)	5.6 (42.0)
Average precipitation mm (inches)	37.0 (1.46)	39.4 (1.55)	46.5 (1.83)	54.3 (2.14)	75.0 (2.95)	89.7 (3.53)	82.1 (3.23)	84.1 (3.31)	74.1 (2.92)	68.8 (2.71)	51.8 (2.04)	49.8 (1.96)	753.4 (29.66)
Average precipitation days (≥ 0.2 mm)	5.0	4.7	6.1	8.7	12.1	14.5	15.8	15.4	12.7	11.2	8.5	7.1	121.8
Source: Australian Bureau of Meteorology; Kyneton

== Tourist attractions ==
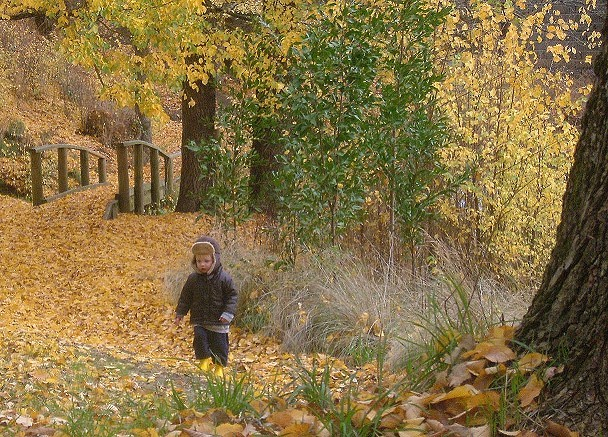
Autumn in the Kyneton Botanical Gardens.

Kyneton offers tourists several points of interest locally including the Botanic Gardens (established in the mid-1800s) and several walks along the Campaspe River.

Various Farmers Markets and festivals throughout the year make the town popular as a day trip destination. The township also serves as a starting point for many nearby destinations, such as Trentham Falls and Hanging Rock in Newham.

There are many attractions that can be accessed from Kyneton's Northern Gateway including Black Hill Reserve, Bald Hill Reserve, Green Hill, Turpin Falls, Kyneton golf course, Kyneton Bushland Resort, Kyneton Ridge Winery, the Northern Biolinks corridor, Rollinson Reserve Horse riding facilities, The Cascades, etc.

Kyneton Museum, located in the old Bank of New South Wales building (built in 1856), houses an extensive collection of local historical items.

Being located well away from any heavily populated areas and their inherent light pollution, Kyneton is also a destination for astronomers seeking a clear view of the Southern Hemisphere night skies due to relatively low light pollution levels as opposed to Australian cities. The Cobaw Plateau is host to a 500-hectare facility for astronomical observation.

== Arts and Culture ==
Kyneton is where the annual Lost Trades Fair and the Daffodil Festival were founded.

It is home to many galleries and artist studios, including:

Stockroom, The Old Auction house, cusack&CUSACK, The Golden Dog Gallery, Art on Piper, Lauriston Press, John Lloyd Gallery and Colours of White.

The Macedon Ranges holds two art specific events, The Daylesford and Macedon Ranges open studios, and the Macedon Ranges Arts Trail.

It is also home to quaint bookstores and many cafes.

== Education ==
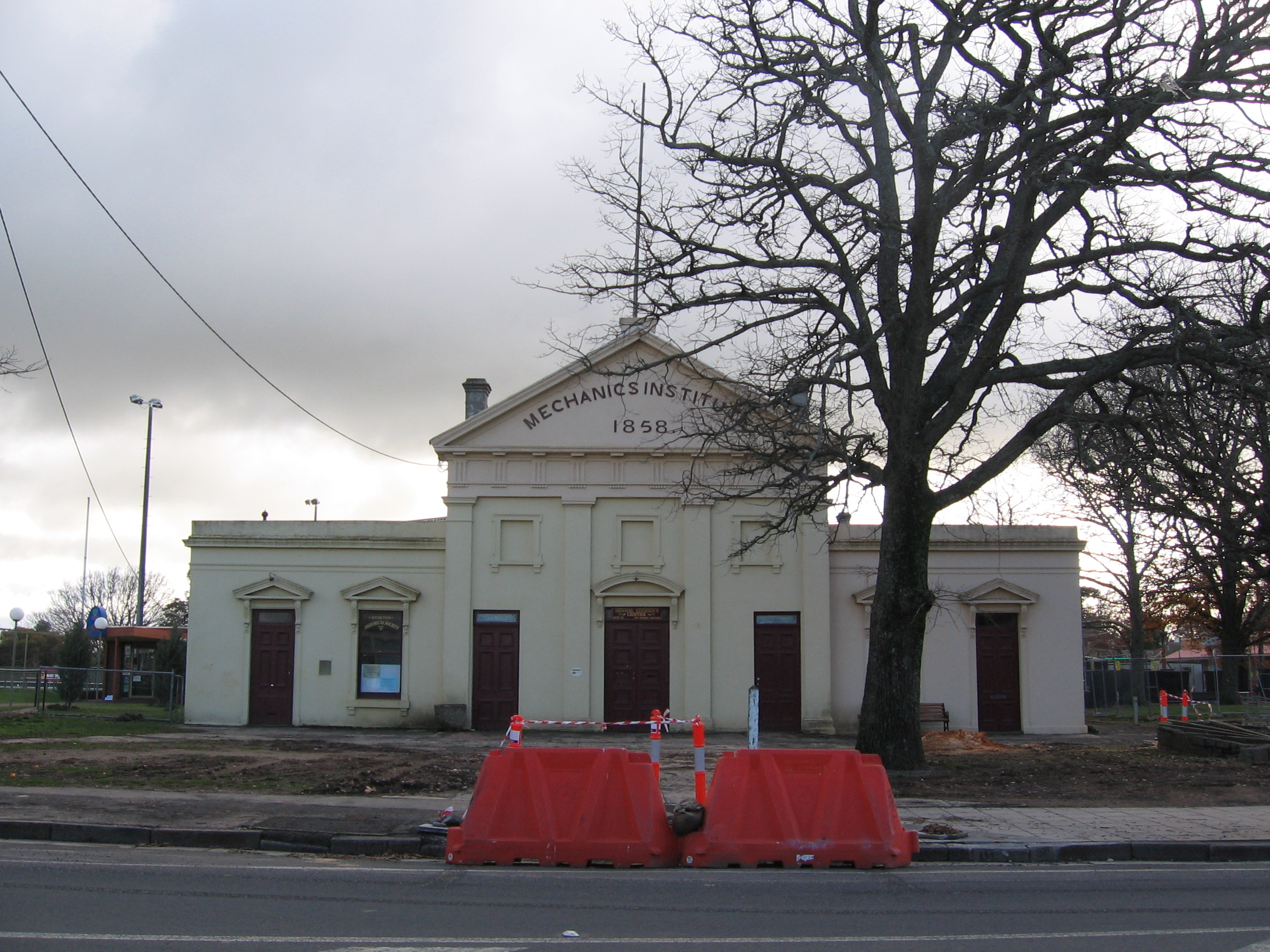
Kyneton Mechanics Hall

Kyneton is centrally located among several outlying towns and serves as an educational hub for primary and secondary students. The following educational institutions are located in the main township:

- Kyneton Primary School
- Our Lady of the Rosary, Kyneton
- Kyneton High School
- Sacred Heart College, Kyneton
- Northern Melbourne Institute of TAFE (NMIT), NMIT Kyneton Park Training Centre (Kyneton Racecourse)

== Sport ==
The town has an Australian rules football team, Kyneton Football Club, competing in the Riddell District Football League.

Kyneton has a horse racing club, the Kyneton District Racing Club, which schedules around sixteen race meetings a year including the Kyneton Cup meeting in November (always the day after the Melbourne Cup). In 2009, the Kyneton District Racing Club partnered with the Northern Melbourne Institute of TAFE to use the facilities of the racecourse and its extensive grounds as an educational training facility.

Golfers play at the course of the Kyneton Golf Club on Black Hill Road.

Kyneton has a football team "The Rangers" which compete in the Melbourne Division 3 under the FFV banner.

Kyneton Croquet Club is the oldest Croquet club in Victoria.

== Heritage listings ==
Kyneton contains a number of heritage-listed sites, including:

- 1 Mollison Street: Kyneton railway station
- 81 Mollison Street: Kyneton Mechanics Institute and Library
- 113 Mollison Street: Kyneton Post Office
- Mollison and Clowes Streets: Kyneton Botanic Gardens
- 3 Piper Street: Kyneton Freemasons Hall
- 11 Piper Street: Stonemasons Yard
- 18–20 Piper Street: Willis Flour Mill
- 38 Piper Street: Velvet Soap Advertising Sign
- 67 Piper Street: Bank of New South Wales Building
- 68–74 Piper Street
- 61 Ebden Street, Kyneton, Church of England Old Rectory
- 1A Hutton Street: Kyneton Court House
- 28 Hutton Street: Kyneton Congregational Church
- 688 Cobb and Co Road: Degraves Mill
- 688 Cobb and Co Road: Skelsmergh Hall
- 1203 Kyneton-Metcalfe Road: Windmill Farm
- Burton Avenue: St Agnes Homestead
- 67 Simpson Street: Kyneton District Hospital
- 93 Harts Lane: Insitu Horseworks
- 1–9 Epping Street: Kyneton Secondary College Buildings and Garden
