= Edward Reynolds (Australian politician) =

Australian politician

Edward Russell Thomas Reynolds QC (16 April 1892 – 13 July 1971) was an Australian politician.

Born at Walhalla, Victoria, to lawyer Thomas O'Loghlen Reynolds and Jane Mary Hutchinson, he attended Coburg State School and then Carlton College where he matriculated in 1908 top of his class. On leaving school, he went to Trinity College, at the University of Melbourne, where he won the Henry Berthon Scholarship in December 1909 for the 1910 academic year and received his Bachelor of Law in 1913. He contested, unsuccessfully, the 1914 Federal Election, in the seat of Maribyrnong. When the election was called, he was 22 years old, but had already done "much valuable work at the last Federal election, and has shown considerable debating ability. As a member of the Trinity College Dialectic Society he gained a reputation as a keen and capable debater. He is a member of the Liberal Speakers' Association."

Reynolds was called to the bar in 1915 but in that year enlisted in the Australian Imperial Force, serving until 1919 as a subaltern in France and Belgium. He married Edna Florence Davy, with whom he had two daughters; later, in 1935, he married Joan Nicholls, with whom he also had two daughters. He was President of the Law Council of Australia from 1947 to 1948 and leader of the Victorian Bar from 1946 to 1952. In 1948 he was elected to the Victorian Legislative Assembly in a by-election for the seat of Toorak as a representative of the Liberal Party, after the death of Robert Bell Hamilton. He served until his resignation in 1952. Reynolds died in 1971 at East Prahran.

He is survived by four daughters, Patricia, Shirley, Leslie and Julia (deceased, 2020).
