= Kyneton High School =

School in Victoria, Australia

Coordinates: 37.2512°S 144.4581°E

Information
- Established: 1928; 98 years ago
- Website: kynetonhigh.vic.edu.au

Kyneton High School is a secondary school in Kyneton, Victoria, Australia, approximately 90 km north of Melbourne. It was built in 1912, and opened in 1928 under the name of Kyneton High School. At on epoint, it was renamed Kyneton Secondary College, but was renamed back to Kyneton High School in 2019.
