= Allan Cameron (politician) =

Australian politician

Allan Francis Cameron (11 April 1868 – 28 December 1923) was an Australian politician.

He was born at Kangaroo Ground to Ewen Hugh Cameron, also a politician, and Agnes Bell. He was a bank manager, running branches of the Commercial Bank at Romsey and Lancefield. On 24 October 1900 he married Jessie Lauder; they had three children. In 1914 he was elected to the Victorian Legislative Assembly as the Liberal member for Dalhousie. He served until his death at Jolimont in 1923.

Victorian Legislative Assembly
Preceded by Reginald Argyle	Member for Dalhousie; 1914–1923	Succeeded by Reg Pollard
