= Edmund Morrissey =

Australian politician (1914–1965)

Edmund "Leo" Morrissey (1914–1965) was an Australian politician. He was a member of the Labor Party (ALP) for the seat of Mernda from December 1952 until April 1955. In 1955, he left the ALP and "crossed the floor" and joined the anti-Communist Democratic Labor Party.

He died on 22 August 1965 at the age of 51 in Diamond Creek.
