= Electoral district of Toorak =

Former state electoral district of Victoria, Australia

Coordinates: 37.84°S 145.01°E

Toorak Victoria—Legislative Assembly
- State: Victoria
- Created: 1889
- Abolished: 1967
- Namesake: suburb of Toorak
- Demographic: Metropolitan

The electoral district of Toorak was an electorate of the Victorian Legislative Assembly in the British colony and later Australian state of Victoria.

== Electoral boundary ==
A 1956 map of electoral boundaries shows the Toorak district encompassing the inner Melbourne suburbs of Toorak and South Yarra. The district was bordered by the Yarra River to the north, Kooyong Road to the east, Commercial Road and Malvern Road to the south and St Kilda Road to the east.

== Members for Toorak ==
| Member | Party | Term |
|---|---|---|
| (Sir) Matthew Davies | | 1889–1892 |
| Alexander McKinley | | 1892–1894 |
| Robert Dyce Reid | | 1894–1897 |
| Duncan Gillies | Conservative–Liberal Coalition | 1897–1903 |
| George Fairbairn | Non-Labor | 1903–1906 |
| Norman Bayles | Ministerialist; Independent; Liberal; Nationalist; Economy Party | 1906–1920 |
| (Sir) Stanley Argyle | Nationalist | 1920–1931 |
| (Sir) Stanley Argyle | United Australia | 1931–1940 |
| Harold Thonemann | United Australia | 1941–1945 |
| Robert Bell Hamilton | Liberal | 1945–1948 |
| Edward Reynolds | Liberal / LCP | 1948–1952 |
| Horace Petty | Liberal and Country (LCP) | 1952–1964 |
| Philip Hudson | LCP / Liberal | 1964–1967 |
