= Leslie Webster (Australian politician) =

Australian politician

Leslie Leeder Webster (9 June 1891 – 6 September 1975) was an Australian politician. He was a Country Party member of the Victorian Legislative Assembly from 1944 to 1947, representing the electorates of Bulla and Dalhousie (1944-1945) and Mernda (1945-1947).

Webster was born at Caulfield, and attended Caulfield Grammar School and the Dookie Agricultural College. He worked on a farm, and subsequently managed an Oakleigh timber firm from 1913 until 1918. He farmed at Flinders Island from 1918 to 1928, running Red Poll and Corriedale cattle and sheep studs, and serving as chairman of the Flinders Island Butter Factory Company, as a member of the local licensing court, and as a councillor for the Flinders Island Council for seven years, including a stint as shire warden. He returned to Victoria in 1928, running a Melbourne timber and hardware business until 1932, and was a dairy farmer at Greendale from 1932. He was the treasurer and acting secretary of the Milk Producers Association at the time of his election.

Webster was elected to the Legislative Assembly at a 1944 by-election for the seat of Bulla and Dalhousie following the death of Country Party MLA and Milk Producers' Association treasurer Reginald James. The electorate was abolished at the 1945 election, when Webster contested and won the electorate of Mernda. He again contested Mernda in 1947, but was defeated by Liberal Party candidate Arthur Ireland.

After his parliamentary defeat, Webster remained a prominent figure in agricultural circles, serving as vice-president and secretary of the Milk Producers' Association, president of the Victorian Chamber of Agriculture, as a member of the Intermediate Sentences Board, and as a member of the Milk Board and the producers' representative on the Milk Supply Committee. Webster died at East Melbourne in 1975, and was buried at Bulla Cemetery.

Webster's son, James Webster, was a Country Party (later National Country Party) Senator for Victoria from 1964 until 1980, and served as federal Minister for Science and the Environment in the Fraser government.

Parliament of Victoria
Preceded by Reginald James	Member for Bulla and Dalhousie; 1944–1945	Succeeded by Seat abolished
Preceded by Seat created	Member for Mernda; 1945–1947	Succeeded by Arthur Ireland
