= Results of the 1943 Victorian state election (Legislative Assembly) =

Australian state election results

Victorian state election, 12 June 1943 Legislative Assembly << 1940–1945 >>
Enrolled voters	1,015,750				
Votes cast	883,679		Turnout	87.00	−6.41
Informal votes	22,876		Informal	2.59	+1.03
Summary of votes by party
Party	Primary votes	%	Swing	Seats	Change
Labor	311,051	36.13	+2.96	22	±0
United Australia	198,582	23.07	−12.34	13	−3
United Country	112,164	13.03	−1.13	18	−4
Communist	38,802	4.51	+4.13	0	±0
Victorian Country	11,738	1.36	−0.98	7	+6
Independent	188,466	21.89	+7.36	5	+1
Total	860,803			65	

This is a list of electoral district results for the Victorian 1943 election.

== Results by electoral district ==
=== Albert Park ===
1943 Victorian state election: Albert Park
Party	Candidate	Votes	%	±%
United Australia	William Haworth	13,452	57.1	+5.5
Independent Socialist	James Coull	10,105	42.9	+42.9
Total formal votes		23,557	96.6	−1.4
Informal votes		830	3.4	+1.4
Turnout		24,387	84.4	−8.5
United Australia hold		Swing	N/A	

=== Allandale ===
1943 Victorian state election: Allandale
Party	Candidate	Votes	%	±%
Labor	Patrick Denigan	4,051	48.2	−10.8
Country	Arthur Boustead	2,394	28.5	+0.5
United Australia	Allen Driscoll	1,967	23.4	+23.4
Total formal votes		8,412	99.4	+0.5
Informal votes		50	0.6	−0.5
Turnout		8,462	89.2	−6.1
Two-party-preferred result
Labor	Patrick Denigan	4,317	51.3	
Country	Arthur Boustead	4,095	48.7	
Labor hold		Swing	N/A	

=== Ballarat ===
1943 Victorian state election: Ballarat
Party	Candidate	Votes	%	±%
United Australia	Thomas Hollway	9,733	59.9	−5.6
Labor	Maurice Calnin	4,551	28.0	−6.5
Communist	Edward Rowe	1,967	12.1	+12.1
Total formal votes		16,251	98.8	−0.6
Informal votes		195	1.2	+0.6
Turnout		16,446	89.7	−4.6
United Australia hold		Swing	N/A	

- Preferences were not distributed.

=== Barwon ===
1943 Victorian state election: Barwon
Party	Candidate	Votes	%	±%
United Australia	Thomas Maltby	7,413	61.2	−38.8
Labor	George Gorrie	4,701	38.8	+38.8
Total formal votes		12,114	99.1	
Informal votes		107	0.9	
Turnout		12,221	88.4	
United Australia hold		Swing	N/A	

=== Benalla ===
1943 Victorian state election: Benalla
Party	Candidate	Votes	%	±%
Country	Frederick Cook	3,779	40.2	−14.8
Labor	Andrew McIntosh	3,109	33.0	+33.0
Country	Percy Johnson	2,520	26.8	+26.8
Total formal votes		9,408	99.1	+0.2
Informal votes		83	0.9	−0.2
Turnout		9,491	87.3	−4.6
Two-party-preferred result
Country	Frederick Cook	5,649	60.0	+15.0
Labor	Andrew McIntosh	3,759	40.0	+40.0
Country gain from Liberal Country		Swing	N/A	

=== Benambra ===
1943 Victorian state election: Benambra
Party	Candidate	Votes	%	±%
Country	Roy Paton	5,481	68.9	−31.1
Independent	Francis Andrews	2,470	31.1	+31.1
Total formal votes		7,951	98.7	
Informal votes		102	1.3	
Turnout		8,053	84.7	
Country hold		Swing	N/A	

=== Bendigo ===
1943 Victorian state election: Bendigo
Party	Candidate	Votes	%	±%
Labor	Arthur Cook	unopposed		
Labor hold		Swing		

=== Boroondara ===
1943 Victorian state election: Boroondara
Party	Candidate	Votes	%	±%
United Australia	Trevor Oldham	19,517	58.4	−12.0
Independent	Lila Monsbourgh	13,881	41.6	+41.6
Total formal votes		33,398	97.9	−0.3
Informal votes		730	2.1	+0.3
Turnout		34,128	86.9	−5.8
United Australia hold		Swing	N/A	

=== Brighton ===
1943 Victorian state election: Brighton
Party	Candidate	Votes	%	±%
United Australia	Ian Macfarlan	12,217	39.1	+9.6
Labor	Robert Gault	9,716	31.2	+31.2
Ind. United Australia	John Warren	9,240	29.6	+29.6
Total formal votes		31,173	98.0	+0.2
Informal votes		648	2.0	−0.2
Turnout		31,821	88.4	−5.8
Two-party-preferred result
United Australia	Ian Macfarlan	20,211	64.8	
Labor	Robert Gault	10,962	35.2	
United Australia gain from Independent		Swing	N/A	

- Sitting member Ian Macfarlan returned to the UAP after winning the seat in the previous election as an Independent.

=== Brunswick ===
1943 Victorian state election: Brunswick
Party	Candidate	Votes	%	±%
Labor	James Jewell	unopposed		
Labor hold		Swing		

=== Bulla and Dalhousie ===
1943 Victorian state election: Bulla and Dalhousie
Party	Candidate	Votes	%	±%
Labor	Edward Cummins	3,003	34.2	−1.9
Country	Reginald James	1,689	19.3	−5.4
United Australia	Aubrey Saunders	1,493	17.0	−22.2
Ind. United Australia	Howard Everard	1,487	16.9	+16.9
Country	John Ryan	1,100	12.5	+12.5
Total formal votes		8,772	96.9	−2.1
Informal votes		280	3.1	+2.1
Turnout		9,052	88.3	−4.6
Two-party-preferred result
Country	Reginald James	4,882	55.7	+55.7
Labor	Edward Cummins	3,890	44.3	−3.4
Country gain from United Australia		Swing	N/A	

=== Carlton ===
1943 Victorian state election: Carlton
Party	Candidate	Votes	%	±%
Labor	Bill Barry	11,408	62.4	−8.9
Communist	Gerald O'Day	3,973	21.7	+13.3
Independent	Richard Bowers	2,889	15.8	+15.8
Total formal votes		18,270	95.5	−0.3
Informal votes		862	4.5	+0.3
Turnout		19,132	84.2	−4.6
Labor hold		Swing	N/A	

- Preferences were not distributed.

=== Castlemaine and Kyneton ===
1943 Victorian state election: Castlemaine and Kyneton
Party	Candidate	Votes	%	±%
Labor	Bill Hodson	5,202	54.1	−3.6
Country	John Thompson	4,420	45.9	+45.9
Total formal votes		9,622	98.9	0.0
Informal votes		111	1.1	0.0
Turnout		9,733	90.7	−3.9
Labor hold		Swing	N/A	

=== Caulfield ===
1943 Victorian state election: Caulfield
Party	Candidate	Votes	%	±%
United Australia	Harold Cohen	10,972	39.9	−31.6
Independent Socialist	Andrew Hughes	7,702	28.0	+28.0
Labor	Anthonie Verbeek	5,653	20.5	+20.5
Ind. United Australia	Edgar Morton	3,174	11.5	+11.5
Total formal votes		27,501	96.6	−1.6
Informal votes		958	3.4	+1.6
Turnout		28,459	87.6	−5.2
Two-candidate-preferred result
Independent Socialist	Andrew Hughes	14,240	51.8	
United Australia	Harold Cohen	13,261	48.2	
Independent Socialist gain from United Australia		Swing	N/A	

=== Clifton Hill ===
1943 Victorian state election: Clifton Hill
Party	Candidate	Votes	%	±%
Labor	Bert Cremean	11,413	53.0	−13.0
Independent	Allan Matthews	6,039	28.0	+28.0
Communist	Ken Miller	4,078	18.9	+18.9
Total formal votes		21,530	96.3	−1.9
Informal votes		834	3.7	+1.9
Turnout		22,364	87.5	−5.4
Labor hold		Swing	N/A	

- Preferences were not distributed.

=== Coburg ===
1943 Victorian state election: Coburg
Party	Candidate	Votes	%	±%
Independent	Charlie Mutton	13,996	50.8	+50.8
Labor	Jessie Satchell	5,806	21.1	−46.0
United Australia	Herbert Rusmussen	3,564	12.9	−20.0
Independent	Charles Hosken	2,801	10.2	+10.2
Independent	Donald McDonald	1,368	5.0	+5.0
Total formal votes		27,535	95.6	−3.0
Informal votes		1,272	4.4	+3.0
Turnout		28,807	87.5	−5.7
Independent gain from Labor		Swing	N/A	

- Preferences were not distributed.

=== Collingwood ===
1943 Victorian state election: Collingwood
Party	Candidate	Votes	%	±%
Labor	Tom Tunnecliffe	9,032	46.1	−2.2
Independent Labor	James Baker	4,838	24.7	−10.3
Communist	Ralph Gibson	4,016	20.5	+13.6
Independent	William King	1,694	8.6	+8.6
Total formal votes		19,580	93.7	−2.0
Informal votes		1,323	6.3	+2.0
Turnout		20,903	85.3	−5.7
Two-candidate-preferred result
Labor	Tom Tunnecliffe	12,279	62.7	
Independent Labor	James Baker	7,301	37.3	
Labor hold		Swing	N/A	

=== Dandenong ===
1943 Victorian state election: Dandenong
Party	Candidate	Votes	%	±%
Labor	Frank Field	20,419	60.6	−0.2
Independent	Gladys Roberts	13,294	39.4	+39.4
Total formal votes		33,713	98.1	−0.8
Informal votes		670	1.9	+0.8
Turnout		34,383	86.6	−7.1
Labor hold		Swing	N/A	

=== Dundas ===
1943 Victorian state election: Dundas
Party	Candidate	Votes	%	±%
Labor	Bill Slater	unopposed		
Labor hold		Swing		

=== Essendon ===
1943 Victorian state election: Essendon
Party	Candidate	Votes	%	±%
Labor	Samuel Merrifield	12,294	45.6	−2.8
United Australia	James Dillon	11,370	42.2	−9.4
Independent	Arthur Dodds	3,296	12.2	+12.2
Total formal votes		26,960	97.8	−1.2
Informal votes		591	2.2	+1.2
Turnout		27,551	89.2	−6.2
Two-party-preferred result
Labor	Samuel Merrifield	14,239	52.8	+4.4
United Australia	James Dillon	12,721	47.2	−4.4
Labor gain from United Australia		Swing	+4.4	

=== Evelyn ===
1943 Victorian state election: Evelyn
Party	Candidate	Votes	%	±%
United Australia	William Everard	6,942	62.4	−37.6
Labor	Jack Gill	4,183	37.6	+37.6
Total formal votes		11,125	98.3	
Informal votes		189	1.7	
Turnout		11,314	85.3	
United Australia hold		Swing	N/A	

=== Flemington ===
1943 Victorian state election: Flemington
Party	Candidate	Votes	%	±%
Labor	Jack Holland	unopposed		
Labor hold		Swing		

=== Footscray ===
1943 Victorian state election: Footscray
Party	Candidate	Votes	%	±%
Labor	Jack Mullens	11,514	39.3	−60.7
Independent	Andrew Hansen	7,128	24.3	+24.3
Communist	Cecil Sharpley	5,614	19.2	+19.2
Independent	Alfred Lowe	3,349	11.4	+11.4
Independent	Robert Thorne	1,680	5.7	+5.7
Total formal votes		29,285	95.1	
Informal votes		1,498	4.9	
Turnout		30,783	90.1	
Two-candidate-preferred result
Labor	Jack Mullens	16,675	56.9	−43.1
Independent	Andrew Hansen	12,610	43.1	+43.1
Labor hold		Swing	N/A	

=== Geelong ===
1943 Victorian state election: Geelong
Party	Candidate	Votes	%	±%
Labor	Fanny Brownbill	unopposed		
Labor hold		Swing		

=== Gippsland East ===
1943 Victorian state election: Gippsland East
Party	Candidate	Votes	%	±%
Country	Albert Lind	unopposed		
Country hold		Swing		

=== Gippsland North ===
1943 Victorian state election: Gippsland North
Party	Candidate	Votes	%	±%
Country	Bill Fulton	5,575	57.4	+11.7
Labor	Reuben Basham	4,141	42.6	+8.8
Total formal votes		9,716	99.0	+0.1
Informal votes		93	1.0	−0.1
Turnout		9,809	87.7	−4.4
Country hold		Swing	−2.5	

=== Gippsland South ===
1943 Victorian state election: Gippsland South
Party	Candidate	Votes	%	±%
Country	Herbert Hyland	9,372	83.5	−16.5
Independent	Maurice Manning	1,853	16.5	+16.5
Total formal votes		11,225	98.7	
Informal votes		148	1.3	
Turnout		11,373	87.4	
Country hold		Swing	N/A	

=== Gippsland West ===
1943 Victorian state election: Gippsland West
Party	Candidate	Votes	%	±%
Country	Matthew Bennett	6,949	67.9	−32.1
Independent	Ernest Watkin	2,279	22.3	+22.3
Independent	Bartholomew Goulding	1,013	9.9	+9.9
Total formal votes		10,241	97.6	
Informal votes		255	2.4	
Turnout		10,496	87.0	
Country hold		Swing	N/A	

=== Goulburn Valley ===
1943 Victorian state election: Goulburn Valley
Party	Candidate	Votes	%	±%
Country	John McDonald	unopposed		
Country hold		Swing		

=== Grant ===
1943 Victorian state election: Grant
Party	Candidate	Votes	%	±%
Country	Frederick Holden	4,461	45.8	−54.2
Labor	Horace Hughes	3,838	39.4	+39.4
Independent	Herbert Ladd	1,433	14.7	+14.7
Total formal votes		9,732	98.3	
Informal votes		164	1.7	
Turnout		9,896	84.5	
Two-party-preferred result
Country	Frederick Holden	5,348	55.0	−45.0
Labor	Horace Hughes	4,384	45.0	+45.0
Country hold		Swing	N/A	

=== Gunbower ===
1943 Victorian state election: Gunbower
Party	Candidate	Votes	%	±%
Country	Norman Martin	unopposed		
Country hold		Swing		

=== Hampden ===
1943 Victorian state election: Hampden
Party	Candidate	Votes	%	±%
United Australia	William Cumming	5,617	61.0	+12.4
Labor	Walter Kervin	3,591	39.0	+6.4
Total formal votes		9,208	99.1	+0.4
Informal votes		79	0.9	−0.4
Turnout		9,287	86.5	−8.4
United Australia hold		Swing	−1.3	

=== Hawthorn ===
1943 Victorian state election: Hawthorn
Party	Candidate	Votes	%	±%
Independent	Leslie Hollins	15,560	63.2	+9.3
United Australia	Lyston Chisholm	9,065	36.8	−9.3
Total formal votes		24,625	97.6	−1.2
Informal votes		598	2.4	+1.2
Turnout		25,223	88.5	−5.2
Independent hold		Swing	+9.3	

=== Heidelberg ===
1943 Victorian state election: Heidelberg
Party	Candidate	Votes	%	±%
United Australia	Henry Zwar	20,185	61.1	−2.5
Labor	Leonard Hartnett	12,852	38.9	+2.5
Total formal votes		33,037	98.8	−0.2
Informal votes		405	1.2	+0.2
Turnout		33,442	89.5	−5.8
United Australia hold		Swing	−2.5	

=== Kara Kara and Borung ===
1943 Victorian state election: Kara Kara and Borung
Party	Candidate	Votes	%	±%
Country	Finlay Cameron	5,147	60.9	+10.7
Labor	Arthur Ackland	3,302	39.1	+39.1
Total formal votes		8,449	99.1	0.0
Informal votes		78	0.9	0.0
Turnout		8,527	88.6	−6.7
Country hold		Swing	N/A	

=== Kew ===
1943 Victorian state election: Kew
Party	Candidate	Votes	%	±%
United Australia	Wilfrid Kent Hughes	unopposed		
United Australia hold		Swing		

=== Korong and Eaglehawk ===
1943 Victorian state election: Korong and Eaglehawk
Party	Candidate	Votes	%	±%
Country	Albert Dunstan	6,028	68.7	−10.1
Labor	William Casey	2,445	27.9	+27.9
Independent	Walter Peters	297	3.4	+3.4
Total formal votes		8,770	98.7	−0.1
Informal votes		113	1.3	+0.1
Turnout		8,883	87.7	−5.7
Country hold		Swing	N/A	

- Preferences were not distributed.

=== Lowan ===
1943 Victorian state election: Lowan
Party	Candidate	Votes	%	±%
Country	Hamilton Lamb	unopposed		
Country hold		Swing		

- Hamilton Lamb was a prisoner-of-war at this time and was not opposed. He died on the Burma Railway on 7 December 1943. Confirmation of his death was not received until September 1944.

=== Maryborough and Daylesford ===
1943 Victorian state election: Maryborough and Daylesford
Party	Candidate	Votes	%	±%
Labor	Clive Stoneham	5,806	60.0	−40.0
Country	Powley Smith	3,866	40.0	+40.0
Total formal votes		9,672	99.3	
Informal votes		66	0.7	
Turnout		9,738	91.1	
Labor hold		Swing	N/A	

=== Melbourne ===
1943 Victorian state election: Melbourne
Party	Candidate	Votes	%	±%
Labor	Tom Hayes	11,273	65.3	−34.7
Independent	John Somerville	5,991	34.7	+34.7
Total formal votes		17,264	96.2	
Informal votes		686	3.8	
Turnout		17,950	75.7	
Labor hold		Swing	N/A	

=== Mildura ===
1943 Victorian state election: Mildura
Party	Candidate	Votes	%	±%
Labor	John Egan	4,428	41.5	+41.5
Country	Albert Allnutt	3,655	34.2	−4.2
Country	Campbell Cameron	2,590	24.3	+24.3
Total formal votes		10,673	97.9	+0.7
Informal votes		230	2.1	−0.7
Turnout		10,903	82.7	−10.3
Two-party-preferred result
Country	Albert Allnutt	5,490	51.4	−2.0
Labor	John Egan	5,183	48.6	+48.6
Country hold		Swing	N/A	

=== Mornington ===
1943 Victorian state election: Mornington
Party	Candidate	Votes	%	±%
Country	Alfred Kirton	unopposed		
Country hold		Swing		

=== Northcote ===
1943 Victorian state election: Northcote
Party	Candidate	Votes	%	±%
Labor	John Cain	unopposed		
Labor hold		Swing		

=== Nunawading ===
1943 Victorian state election: Nunawading
Party	Candidate	Votes	%	±%
Labor	Bob Gray	9,498	36.9	+7.4
Independent	Ivy Weber	8,665	33.7	−0.9
United Australia	John Hogan	6,085	23.7	−8.0
Independent	Clifford Wolfe	1,480	5.8	+5.8
Total formal votes		25,728	96.9	−1.1
Informal votes		813	3.1	+1.1
Turnout		26,541	88.0	−5.5
Two-candidate-preferred result
Independent	Ivy Weber	14,492	56.3	+0.2
Labor	Bob Gray	11,236	43.7	+43.7
Independent hold		Swing	N/A	

=== Oakleigh ===
1943 Victorian state election: Oakleigh
Party	Candidate	Votes	%	±%
Labor	Squire Reid	19,687	58.1	+3.1
United Australia	Andrew Sinclair	14,214	41.9	−3.1
Total formal votes		33,901	98.8	−0.2
Informal votes		396	1.2	+0.2
Turnout		34,297	87.8	−6.8
Labor hold		Swing	+3.1	

=== Ouyen ===
1943 Victorian state election: Ouyen
Party	Candidate	Votes	%	±%
Country	Keith Dodgshun	5,211	67.8	−5.2
Labor	Frederick Watson	1,823	23.7	+23.7
Independent	Robert Johnstone	650	8.5	−18.5
Total formal votes		7,684	98.9	+0.1
Informal votes		85	1.1	−0.1
Turnout		7,769	87.4	−5.9
Country hold		Swing	N/A	

- Preferences were not distributed.

=== Polwarth ===
1943 Victorian state election: Polwarth
Party	Candidate	Votes	%	±%
Country	Edward Guye	6,911	66.6	+25.0
Labor	Arthur Jackson	3,466	33.4	+33.4
Total formal votes		10,377	99.4	+0.3
Informal votes		57	0.6	−0.3
Turnout		10,434	87.8	−6.6
Country gain from United Australia		Swing	N/A	

=== Port Fairy and Glenelg ===
1943 Victorian state election: Port Fairy and Glenelg
Party	Candidate	Votes	%	±%
Independent Country	Harry Hedditch	4,589	44.5	+44.5
Labor	Martin Bourke	3,985	38.6	−21.1
Independent	James Hardy	1,002	9.7	+9.7
Country	Paul Bailey	740	7.2	−11.3
Total formal votes		10,316	98.6	−0.1
Informal votes		144	1.4	+0.1
Turnout		10,460	87.6	−8.2
Two-candidate-preferred result
Independent Country	Harry Hedditch	5,611	54.4	
Labor	Martin Bourke	4,705	45.6	
Independent Country gain from Labor		Swing	N/A	

=== Port Melbourne ===
1943 Victorian state election: Port Melbourne
Party	Candidate	Votes	%	±%
Labor	Tom Corrigan	11,644	61.2	−38.8
Communist	John Blake	7,384	38.8	+38.8
Total formal votes		19,028	95.8	
Informal votes		828	4.2	
Turnout		19,856	87.6	
Labor hold		Swing	N/A	

=== Prahran ===
1943 Victorian state election: Prahran
Party	Candidate	Votes	%	±%
United Australia	John Ellis	13,031	49.1	−6.7
Labor	John Ryder	10,123	38.1	−6.1
Communist	Malcolm Good	3,406	12.8	+12.8
Total formal votes		26,560	96.8	−1.4
Informal votes		880	3.2	+1.4
Turnout		37,440	83.3	−7.3
Two-party-preferred result
United Australia	John Ellis	13,994	52.7	−3.1
Labor	John Ryder	12,566	47.4	+3.1
United Australia hold		Swing	−3.1	

=== Richmond ===
1943 Victorian state election: Richmond
Party	Candidate	Votes	%	±%
Labor	Ted Cotter	14,483	68.4	−31.6
Communist	Bertha Laidler	6,690	31.6	+31.6
Total formal votes		21,173	94.7	
Informal votes		1,191	5.3	
Turnout		22,364	85.5	
Labor hold		Swing	N/A	

=== Rodney ===
1943 Victorian state election: Rodney
Party	Candidate	Votes	%	±%
Country	William Dunstone	4,489	44.6	−11.5
Independent	Gordon Anderson	2,918	29.0	+29.0
Labor	Algernon Roberts	2,670	26.5	+26.5
Total formal votes		10,077	99.0	+0.3
Informal votes		102	1.0	−0.3
Turnout		10,179	87.2	−5.7
Two-party-preferred result
Country	William Dunstone	5,209	51.7	−4.4
Independent	Gordon Anderson	4,868	48.3	+48.3
Country hold		Swing	N/A	

=== St Kilda ===
1943 Victorian state election: St Kilda
Party	Candidate	Votes	%	±%
United Australia	Archie Michaelis	15,135	53.9	+0.6
Labor	Marjorie Bennett	10,503	37.4	+37.4
Independent	Ethel Pace	2,428	8.7	+8.7
Total formal votes		28,066	96.6	−1.6
Informal votes		987	3.4	+1.6
Turnout		29,053	86.4	−5.6
United Australia hold		Swing	N/A	

- Preferences were not distributed.

=== Stawell and Ararat ===
1943 Victorian state election: Stawell and Ararat
Party	Candidate	Votes	%	±%
Country	Alec McDonald	5,155	52.0	−2.1
Labor	Ernie Morton	4,763	48.0	+2.1
Total formal votes		9,918	99.4	+0.3
Informal votes		60	0.6	−0.3
Turnout		9,978	89.3	−5.4
Country hold		Swing	−2.1	

=== Swan Hill ===
1943 Victorian state election: Swan Hill
Party	Candidate	Votes	%	±%
Country	Francis Old	4,590	62.7	+3.5
Labor	William Kent	2,727	37.3	+37.3
Total formal votes		7,317	97.0	−1.4
Informal votes		223	3.0	+1.4
Turnout		7,540	84.6	−9.4
Country hold		Swing	N/A	

=== Toorak ===
1943 Victorian state election: Toorak
Party	Candidate	Votes	%	±%
United Australia	Harold Thonemann	11,485	47.0	−53.0
Independent	Charles Kennett	5,617	23.0	+23.0
Independent	Garnet Kerr	4,661	19.1	+19.1
Independent	Francis Connelly	2,677	11.0	+11.0
Total formal votes		24,440	95.8	
Informal votes		1,081	4.2	
Turnout		25,521	84.4	
Two-candidate-preferred result
United Australia	Harold Thonemann	14,699	60.1	−39.9
Independent	Charles Kennett	9,741	39.9	+39.9
United Australia hold		Swing	N/A	

=== Upper Goulburn ===
1943 Victorian state election: Upper Goulburn
Party	Candidate	Votes	%	±%
Country	Edwin Mackrell	unopposed		
Country hold		Swing		

=== Upper Yarra ===
1943 Victorian state election: Upper Yarra
Party	Candidate	Votes	%	±%
United Australia	George Knox	10,307	65.0	−35.0
Labor	Arthur Fraser	3,874	24.4	+24.4
Communist	George Brown	1,674	10.6	+10.6
Total formal votes		16,185	86.6	
Informal votes		330	98.0	
Turnout		16,185	86.6	
United Australia hold		Swing	N/A	

- Preferences were not distributed.

=== Walhalla ===
1943 Victorian state election: Walhalla
Party	Candidate	Votes	%	±%
Labor	Leslie Kaeppel	4,750	42.0	+42.0
Country	William Moncur	3,235	28.6	−71.4
Country	William Simpson	2,077	18.4	+18.4
Country	David White	824	7.3	+7.3
Independent	Jack Whiteacre	421	3.7	+3.7
Total formal votes		11,307	96.4	
Informal votes		425	3.6	
Turnout		11,732	87.9	
Two-party-preferred result
Country	William Moncur	5,844	51.7	−48.3
Labor	Leslie Kaeppel	5,463	48.3	+48.3
Country hold		Swing	N/A	

=== Wangaratta and Ovens ===
1943 Victorian state election: Wangaratta and Ovens
Party	Candidate	Votes	%	±%
Country	Lot Diffey	6,478	66.5	−7.3
Labor	Charles McKissack	3,263	33.5	+33.5
Total formal votes		9,741	98.9	+0.2
Informal votes		108	1.1	−0.2
Turnout		9,849	87.0	−5.6
Country hold		Swing	N/A	

=== Waranga ===
1943 Victorian state election: Waranga
Party	Candidate	Votes	%	±%
Country	Ernest Coyle	5,185	70.0	−30.0
Independent	Patrick Finnigan	2,227	30.0	+30.0
Total formal votes		7,412	99.0	
Informal votes		78	1.0	
Turnout		7,490	87.1	
Country hold		Swing	N/A	

=== Warrenheip and Grenville ===
1943 Victorian state election: Warrenheip and Grenville
Party	Candidate	Votes	%	±%
Labor	Raymond Hyatt	3,263	36.5	+36.5
Country	Edmond Hogan	3,256	36.4	−15.3
Independent	Albert Woodward	2,428	27.1	−8.0
Total formal votes		8,947	98.4	+0.2
Informal votes		145	1.6	−0.2
Turnout		9,092	89.8	−4.6
Two-party-preferred result
Labor	Raymond Hyatt	4,987	55.7	
Country	Edmond Hogan	3,960	44.3	
Labor gain from Country		Swing	N/A	

=== Warrnambool ===
1943 Victorian state election: Warrnambool
Party	Candidate	Votes	%	±%
Country	Henry Bailey	6,725	62.2	−1.6
Labor	John McDonald	4,090	37.8	+37.8
Total formal votes		10,815	97.2	−1.7
Informal votes		313	2.8	+1.7
Turnout		11,128	88.3	−6.7
Country hold		Swing	N/A	

=== Williamstown ===
1943 Victorian state election: Williamstown
Party	Candidate	Votes	%	±%
Labor	John Lemmon	13,526	57.9	−1.4
Independent	George Paine	9,846	42.1	+1.4
Total formal votes		23,372	98.4	−0.3
Informal votes		382	1.6	+0.3
Turnout		23,754	89.7	−3.7
Labor hold		Swing	−1.4	

=== Wonthaggi ===
1943 Victorian state election: Wonthaggi
Party	Candidate	Votes	%	±%
Labor	William McKenzie	unopposed		
Labor hold		Swing		

== See also ==
- 1943 Victorian state election
- Members of the Victorian Legislative Assembly, 1943–1945
