= 1945 Victorian state election =

Australian state election

- 10 November 1945

All 65 seats in the Victorian Legislative Assembly (Note: Eleven seats − including eight Labor-held seats (Bendigo, Collingwood, Footscray, Geelong, Melbourne, Moonee Ponds, Northcote, Sunshine) and three Liberal-held seats (Kew, Malvern, Scoresby) − were uncontested and thus retained by the incumbent parties.) 33 seats needed for a majority
- Registered: 1,019,063
- Turnout: 87.98% (▲0.98)
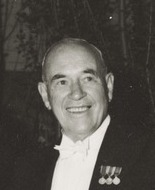

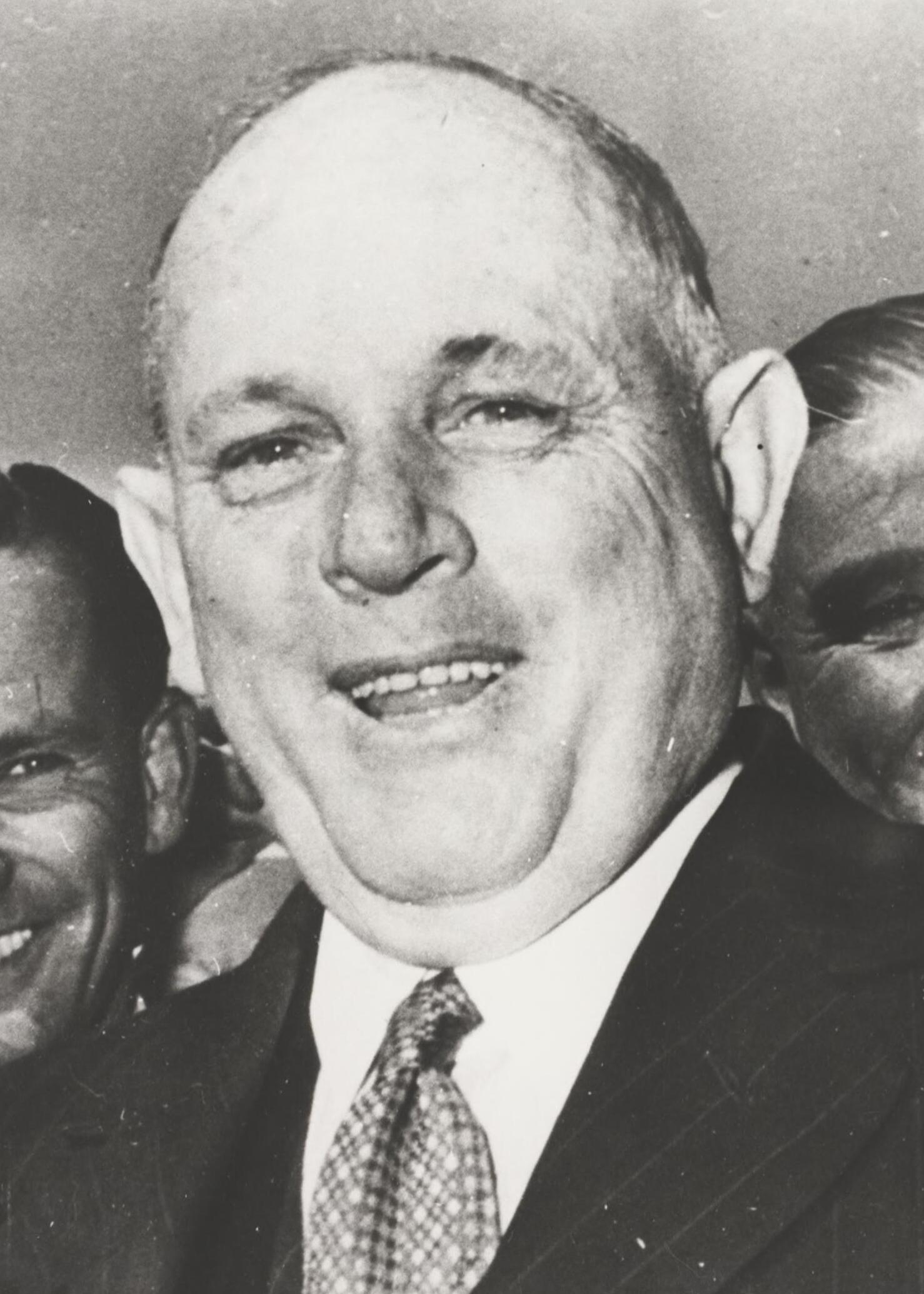

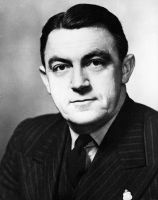

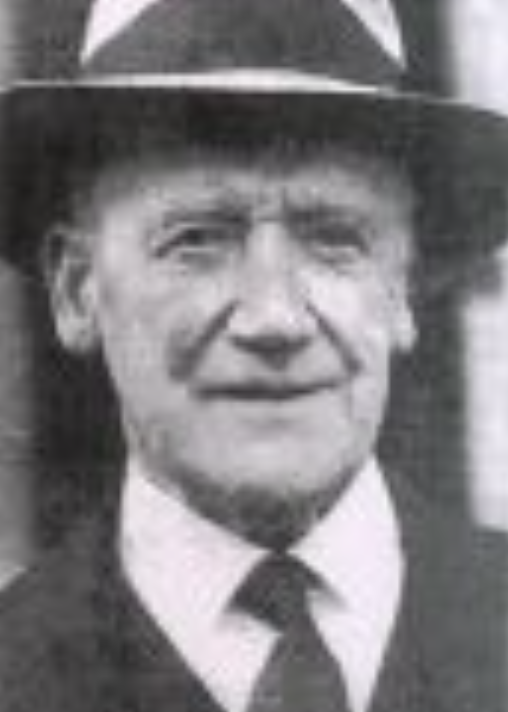
	First party	Second party
Leader	John Cain	Albert Dunstan
Party	Labor	Country (Note: The Country Party was officially known as the United Country Party (UCP) from September 1930 until March 1947, although it was still commonly referred to as the "Country Party".)
Leader since	18 October 1937	14 March 1935
Leader's seat	Northcote	Korong
Last election	22 seats	18 seats
Seats won	31	18
Seat change	▲9	Steady
Primary vote	360,079	163,940
Percentage	41.02%	18.67%
Swing	▲4.89	▲5.64
	Third party	Fourth party
Leader	Thomas Hollway	Ian Macfarlan
Party	Liberal	Ministerial
Leader since	3 December 1940	2 October 1945
Leader's seat	Ballarat	Brighton (lost seat)
Last election	13 seats	Did not exist
Seats won	10	3
Seat change	▼3	▲3
Primary vote	188,119	29,276
Percentage	20.51%	3.33%
Swing	▼2.56	▲3.33
- Results in each electorate
Premier before election
Ian Macfarlan
Ministerial Liberal
Premier after election
John Cain
Labor

The 1945 Victorian state election was held on 10 November 1945 to elect all 65 members of the Victorian Legislative Assembly.

The Labor Party, led by John Cain, won 31 seats and formed government with the support of two independents. Labor defeated the Country Party, led by former premier Albert Dunstan, and the Liberal Party, led by Thomas Hollway.

The incumbent premier at the election was Ian Macfarlan, the deputy leader of the Liberal Party, who became premier on 2 October 1945 after the Dunstan government was defeated on the floor of parliament. Macfarlan contested the election as a Ministerial Liberal, but lost his seat of Brighton to an endorsed Liberal candidate. This marks the only time in Victorian history where the sitting premier did not lead any of the three largest parties at an election.

== Background ==
The Country Party was returned to power at the 1943 state election, with Albert Dunstan serving as premier. The ministry was composed entirely of Country MPs, with the United Australia Party (UAP) giving supply in parliament.

On 10 September 1943, the Dunstan government was defeated on the floor of parliament after Labor Party MPs voted for a motion of no confidence brought forward by UAP leader Thomas Hollway on the issue of electoral redistribution. Dunstan resigned as premier on 14 September, and Labor leader John Cain was sworn in.

Four days later on 18 September 1943, Dunstan was again sworn in as premier after the Country Party formed a coalition government with the UAP.

A Victorian division of the Liberal Party of Australia, which had been formed on 13 October 1944, was established between December 1944 and January 1945. The Victorian UAP branch and its parliamentary members joined the Liberal Party on 5 March 1945, with the state parliamentary UAP becoming the state parliamentary Liberal Party, prior to the national UAP being absorbed into the Liberal Party of Australia in October 1945.

On 25 September 1945, the second Dunstan ministry was defeated on the floor of the Legislative Assembly amid dissatisfaction with the premier's leadership. Five dissident Liberals, two expelled Country MPs (Albert Allnutt and Edwin Mackrell), two independents and one Independent Labor MP voted with Labor to block supply to the government.

Instead of resigning, Dunstan persuaded governor Winston Dugan to grant him a dissolution of parliament, on the condition that the budget was passed. When it became clear that the Assembly would not grant supply, Dugan commissioned deputy Liberal leader Ian Macfarlan to serve as premier with written assurances from Labor and other non-Country MPs. Macfarlan formed a government on 2 October 1945 and parliament was dissolved, with Macfarlan serving as premier until 21 November 1945, eleven days after the state election.

== Candidates ==
The Labor Party endorsed 56 candidates, the Country Party endorsed 33, the Liberal Party endorsed 31 and the Communist Party of Australia endorsed six.

=== Ministerial Liberals ===
Five Liberal MPs who voted against the Dunstan government and joined the Macfarlan ministry (William Cumming, William Everard, William Haworth, Thomas Maltby and Archie Michaelis) − as well as Macfarlan himself − had their preselection vetoed by the Liberal Party's State Council. The Liberals endorsed candidates against all so-called "breakaways", although the party still recommended preferencing the breakaways over Labor candidates.

The breakaways − along with ministers Edwin Mackrell (Independent Country) and Leslie Hollins (independent), as well as Macfarlan supporter Henry Zwar (Independent Liberal) − contested the election as "Ministerial Liberal" candidates. They were also referred to as "Marfarlan Liberals" or "Government Liberals".

In Toorak, four different Liberal candidates stood without official party endorsement, in what The Argus described as "probably the most complicated and bewildering [contest] in the history of the electorate". Incumbent Liberal MP Harold Thonemann was endorsed by the local Liberal selection committee, but a number of branch members supported Robert Hamilton as the candidate. Neither candidate was officially endorsed by the Liberals, leaving both to stand as "Unendorsed Liberal" candidates, while Charles Kennett stood as an Independent Liberal and Robert Bruce stood as a Ministerial Liberal (also using the "Liberal and Country League" label). Additionally, Albert Nicholls stood as an Independent Labor candidate and John Smith ran under the "Moderate Labor" label.

== Campaign ==
Labor announced it would establish a Minister for Employment if elected, with Cain promising a "sane and stable government for the grave years ahead". Dunstan said a Country Party government would support the "full utilisation of our vast coal resources" and oppose further electoral redistributions that would "further deprive country people of their parliamentary representation".

The Liberals focused its campaign around education, including making education free from pre-school to university, raising the school-leaving age to 16 and extending free bus services to cover primary and secondary schools. Although the Ministerial Liberals did not have enough candidates to lead the next government, Macfarlan still campaigned, saying his government had "restored harmony" and "shown its capacity to deal promptly with matters that have long been neglected".

The Communist Party called for the immediate improvement in the wages and working conditions of the public service and the police, proportional representation in the Legislative Assembly, the abolition of the Legislative Council, universal suffrage at the age of 18 in state and local elections, and the nationalisation of the Metropolitan Gas Company.

== Results ==
Legislative Assembly (IRV) – (CV)
Party	Votes	%	Swing	Seats	Change
Labor	360,079	41.02	+4.89	31	▲9
Liberal	180,046	20.51	−2.56	10	▼3
Country	163,940	18.67	+5.64	18	Steady
Independents	67,414	7.68	−7.25	2	▼3
Ministerial	29,276	3.33	+3.33	3	▲3
Communist	25,083	2.86	−1.65	0	Steady
Independent Labor	67,414	2.31	−1.00	1	Steady
Independent Liberal	19,278	2.20	+2.20	0	Steady
Independent Country	4,404	0.50	−0.37	0	Steady
Formal votes	877,872	97.92	+0.51		
Informal votes	18,689	2.08	−0.51		
Total	896,561	100.0		65	
Registered voters / turnout	1,019,063	87.98	+0.98		

== See also ==
- 1946 Victorian Legislative Council election
