= First Cain ministry =

50th ministry of the Government of Victoria

- 50th ministry of Victoria, Australia
- Date formed: 14 September 1943
- Date dissolved: 18 September 1943

People and organisations
- Monarch: George VI
- Governor: Sir Winston Dugan
- Premier: John Cain
- Deputy premier: Herbert Cremean
- No. of ministers: 12
- Member party: Labor
- Status in legislature: Minority government
- Opposition party: United Australia–United Country Coalition
- Opposition leader: Albert Dunstan

History
- Predecessor: First Dunstan ministry
- Successor: Second Dunstan ministry

The First Cain Ministry was the 50th ministry of the Government of Victoria (Australia). It was led by the Premier of Victoria, John Cain of the Labor Party. The ministry was sworn in on 14 September 1943, but lasted less than four days. On 15 September, barely 24 hours after Governor of Victoria Sir Winston Dugan had sworn-in the cabinet, the government was defeated in the Legislative Assembly. Cain's motion to adjourn the parliament for over a week was defeated by the Country Party and the UAP, and Opposition Leader, Albert Dunstan, moved that Parliament resume the next day, giving notice that he would move a motion of no confidence against Cain's government, confident it would be carried by the CP–UAP alliance. Cain indicated that he would request a dissolution of parliament from the Governor, but if his request was refused, he would resign as Premier. On 17 September, Cain visited the Governor who refused his request for a dissolution—Cain then resigned and the Governor commissioned Dunstan to form a government, which was sworn in on Saturday 18 September.

== Portfolios ==
Minister	Portfolios
John Cain, MLA	Premier; Treasurer; Minister for Decentralization and Reconstruction
Herbert Cremean, MLA	Deputy Premier; Chief Secretary
Frank Field, MLA	Minister of Public Instruction; Vice-President of the Board of Lands and Works
William Slater, MLA	Attorney-General; Solicitor-General; Minister in Charge of Electrical Undertakings
William McKenzie, MLA	Minister for Agriculture; Minister of Mines
Bill Barry, MLA	Minister of Transport
Jack Holland, MLA	Minister for Works
Percy Clarey, MLC	Minister of Public Health; Minister of Labour
Daniel McNamara, MLC	Ministers without Portfolio
Clive Stoneham, MLA	Ministers without Portfolio
Pat Kennelly, MLC	Ministers without Portfolio
Paul Jones, MLC	Ministers without Portfolio

== See also ==
- Second Cain ministry
- Third Cain ministry

Parliament of Victoria
Preceded by First Dunstan Ministry	First Cain Ministry; 1943	Succeeded by Second Dunstan Ministry
