= Candidates of the 1943 Victorian state election =

The 1943 Victorian state election was held on 12 June 1943.

== Retiring Members ==
=== Labor ===
- Ernie Bond MLA (Port Fairy and Glenelg)

=== United Australia ===
- Harry White MLA (Bulla and Dalhousie)

== Legislative Assembly ==
Sitting members are shown in bold text. Successful candidates are highlighted in the relevant colour. Where there is possible confusion, an asterisk (*) is also used.

Electorate	Held by	Labor candidates	UAP candidates	Country candidates	Other candidates
Albert Park	UAP		**William Haworth**		James Coull (Ind Soc)
Allandale	Labor	**Patrick Denigan**	Allen Driscoll	Arthur Boustead	
Ballarat	UAP	Maurice Calnin	**Thomas Hollway**		Edward Rowe (CPA)
Barwon	UAP	George Gorrie	**Thomas Maltby**		
Benalla	LCP	Andrew McIntosh		**Frederick Cook***; Percy Johnson	
Benambra	Country			**Roy Paton**	Francis Andrews (Ind)
Bendigo	Labor	**Arthur Cook**			
Boroondara	UAP		**Trevor Oldham**		Lila Monsbourgh (Ind)
Brighton	Independent	Robert Gault	**Ian Macfarlan**		John Warren (Ind UAP)
Brunswick	Labor	**James Jewell**			
Bulla and Dalhousie	UAP	Edward Cummins	Aubrey Saunders	Reginald James*; John Ryan	Howard Everard (Ind UAP)
Carlton	Labor	**Bill Barry**			Richard Bowers (Ind); Gerald O'Day (CPA)
Castlemaine and Kyneton	Labor	**Bill Hodson**		John Thompson	
Caulfield	UAP	Anthonie Verbeek	**Harold Cohen**		Andrew Hughes* (Ind Soc); Edgar Morton (Ind UAP)
Clifton Hill	Labor	**Bert Cremean**			Allan Matthews (Ind); Ken Miller (CPA)
Coburg	Independent	Jessie Satchell	Herbert Rusmussen		Charles Hosken (Ind); Donald McDonald (Ind); **Charlie Mutton*** (Ind)
Collingwood	Labor	**Tom Tunnecliffe**			James Baker (Ind Lab); Ralph Gibson (CPA); William King (Ind)
Dandenong	Labor	**Frank Field**			Gladys Roberts (Ind)
Dundas	Labor	**Bill Slater**			
Essendon	UAP	Samuel Merrifield	**James Dillon**		Arthur Dodds (Ind)
Evelyn	UAP	Jack Gill	**William Everard**		
Flemington	Labor	**Jack Holland**			
Footscray	Labor	**Jack Mullens**			Andrew Hansen (Ind); Alfred Lowe (Ind); Cecil Sharpley (CPA); Robert Thorne (Ind)
Geelong	Labor	**Fanny Brownbill**			
Gippsland East	Country			**Albert Lind**	
Gippsland North	Country	Reuben Basham		**Bill Fulton**	
Gippsland South	Country			**Herbert Hyland**	Maurice Manning (Ind)
Gippsland West	Country			**Matthew Bennett**	Bartholomew Goulding (Ind); Ernest Watkin (Ind)
Goulburn Valley	Country			**John McDonald**	
Grant	Independent	Horace Hughes		**Frederick Holden**	Herbert Ladd (Ind)
Gunbower	Country			**Norman Martin**	
Hampden	UAP	Walter Kervin	**William Cumming**		
Hawthorn	Independent		Lyston Chisholm		**Leslie Hollins** (Ind)
Heidelberg	UAP	Leonard Hartnett	**Henry Zwar**		
Kara Kara and Borung	Country	Arthur Ackland		**Finlay Cameron**	
Kew	UAP		**Wilfrid Kent Hughes**		
Korong and Eaglehawk	Country	William Casey		**Albert Dunstan**	Walter Peters (Ind)
Lowan	Country			**Hamilton Lamb**	
Maryborough and Daylesford	Labor	**Clive Stoneham**		Powley Smith	
Melbourne	Labor	**Tom Hayes**			John Somerville (Ind)
Mildura	Country	John Egan		**Albert Allnutt***; Campbell Cameron	
Mornington	Country			**Alfred Kirton**	
Northcote	Labor	**John Cain**			
Nunawading	Independent	Bob Gray	John Hogan		**Ivy Weber*** (Ind); Clifford Wolfe (Ind)
Oakleigh	Labor	**Squire Reid**	Andrew Sinclair		
Ouyen	Country	Frederick Watson		**Keith Dodgshun**	Robert Johnstone (Ind)
Polwarth	Country	Arthur Jackson		**Edward Guye**	
Port Fairy and Glenelg	Labor	Martin Bourke		Paul Bailey	James Hardy (Ind); Harry Hedditch* (Ind CP)
Port Melbourne	Labor	**Tom Corrigan**			John Blake (CPA)
Prahran	UAP	John Ryder	**John Ellis**		Malcolm Good (CPA)
Richmond	Labor	**Ted Cotter**			Bertha Laidler (CPA)
Rodney	Country	Algernon Roberts		**William Dunstone**	Gordon Anderson (Ind)
St Kilda	UAP	Marjorie Bennett	**Archie Michaelis**		Ethel Pace (Ind)
Stawell and Ararat	Country	Ernie Morton		**Alec McDonald**	
Swan Hill	Country	William Kent		**Francis Old**	
Toorak	UAP		**Harold Thonemann**		Francis Connelly (Ind); Charles Kennett (Ind); Garnet Kerr (Ind)
Upper Goulburn	Country			**Edwin Mackrell**	
Upper Yarra	UAP	Arthur Fraser	**George Knox**		George Brown (CPA)
Walhalla	Country	Leslie Kaeppel		**William Moncur***; William Simpson; David White	Jack Whiteacre (Ind)
Wangaratta and Ovens	Country	Charles McKissack		**Lot Diffey**	
Waranga	Country			**Ernest Coyle**	Patrick Finnigan (Ind)
Warrenheip and Grenville	Country	Raymond Hyatt		**Edmond Hogan**	Albert Woodward (Ind)
Warrnambool	Country	John McDonald		**Henry Bailey**	
Williamstown	Labor	**John Lemmon**			George Paine (Ind)
Wonthaggi	Labor	**William McKenzie**			

== See also ==
- 1943 Victorian Legislative Council election
