= Liberal–National Coalition (Victoria) =

Political alliance in Australia

- Coalition logo used at the 2014 state election
- Liberal leader: Jess Wilson
- Nationals leader: Danny O'Brien
- Founded: 12 February 2008; 18 years ago (most recent iteration)
- Ideology: Conservatism (Australian); Liberalism (Australian); Liberal conservatism; Agrarianism
- Political position: Centre-right to right-wing
- Colors: Blue
- Member parties: Liberal Party; National Party
- Former member parties: United Australia Party (1932–35; 1943–45); Liberal Party (original) (1945–48)
- Legislative Assembly: 28 / 88
- Legislative Council: 13 / 49
- House of Representatives: 9 / 39 (Victorian seats)
- Senate: 4 / 12 (Victorian seats)

The Liberal–National Coalition, commonly known simply as the Coalition, is an alliance of centre-right political parties that forms one of the two major groupings in Victorian politics. The two partners in the Coalition are the Liberal Party and the National Party (the latter previously known as the Country Party and the United Country Party). (Note: The Country Party was officially known as the United Country Party (UCP) from September 1930 until March 1947, although it was still commonly referred to as the "Country Party".)

The Coalition's main opponent is the Australian Labor Party (ALP), which has been the dominant political party in Victoria since the 1999 state election. The Coalition last governed Victoria between 2010 and 2014, and as of 2025, it serves as the opposition with Jess Wilson as Liberal leader and Danny O'Brien as Nationals leader.

== History ==
=== Origins and UAP–UCP coalitions ===
The Victorian Country Party was formed on 23 September 1930 as the United Country Party (UCP) following a merger between the original Country Party (linked to the Victorian Farmers' Union) and the Country Progressive Party. The other major non-Labor party at the time, the Nationalist Party, was renamed to the United Australia Party (UAP) on 15 September 1931.

At the 1932 state election, the UAP won 31 seats, just shy of the 33 needed for a majority. Following the election, the UAP formed a coalition with the UCP, with several UCP MPs serving in the ministry. UAP leader Sir Stanley Argyle was sworn in as Premier, replacing Labor's Edmond Hogan.

At a meeting of the UCP's Central Council and its parliamentary members on 19 March 1935, the sudden decision was taken to end the coalition after Argyle refused to give the UCP additional ministerial portfolios. Argyle was forced to form a new ministry composed entirely of UAP members, accusing the UCP of double-crossing and betraying the UAP.

The UCP served in government, led by Albert Dunstan, beginning on 2 April 1935 after the Argyle government was defeated in parliament. The UAP was reduced to 13 seats after the 1943 state election. Labor gave the UCP support until following the 1943 state election, when the UAP gave supply. In September 1943, the Dunstan government was briefly defeated and Labor leader John Cain sworn in as premier, but Dunstan soon returned days after the UCP formed a coalition government with the UAP.

=== LCP formation and continued split ===
The Victorian UAP branch and its parliamentary members joined the newly-formed Liberal Party on 5 March 1945, with the state parliamentary UAP becoming the state parliamentary Liberal Party, prior to the national UAP being absorbed into the Liberal Party of Australia in October 1945.

The 1947 state election resulted in the Liberal–Country coalition winning a substantial majority of 47 seats, with Liberal leader Thomas Hollway becoming Premier and Country leader John McDonald becoming Deputy Premier. This arrangement existed until 3 December 1948, when the Country ministers resigned and returned to sitting in opposition.

In March 1949, the Liberal Party formed a new Liberal and Country Party (LCP) as part of an attempt to unite both parties. Six Country MPs joined the LCP, but the Country Party rejected the idea, claiming it was an attempt to eliminate the party from Victorian politics.

=== Coalition return ===
The LCP (renamed to the Liberal Party in 1964) and the Country Party (renamed to the National Party in 1975) continued contesting elections separately for around 40 years. This was until 1990, when the parties agreed to establish a formal coalition. Under the leadership of Liberal leader Jeff Kennett, the Coalition defeated Labor in the 1992 state election and again in 1996.

Following the Labor Party's win at the Frankston East state supplementary election, which meant they would win the 1999 state election, Pat McNamara resigned as Nationals leader. Peter Ryan was elected as the new leader. A joint meeting of the National Party's state council and caucus voted to break up the Coalition on 14 July 2000. This decision followed the loss of the 2000 Benalla by-election to Labor, and a subsequent review established by party leader Peter Ryan.

After suffering election losses to Labor in 2002 and 2006, the Liberals and Nationals re-established their alliance on 12 February 2008. The Coalition won the 2010 state election but lost office after a single term in 2014.

Following further state election losses in 2018 and 2022, The Age reported that some Nationals MPs were prepared to push for the end of the Coalition, although this did not eventuate.

== Election results ==
=== Legislative Assembly ===
Election	Leader	Votes	%	Seats	+/–	Position	Status
1992	Jeff Kennett	1,358,295	51.99%	61 / 88	▲19	▲1st	Majority
1996	Jeff Kennett	1,397,352	50.68%	58 / 88	▼3	1st	Majority
1999	Jeff Kennett	1,330,928	47.02%	43 / 88	▼15	1st	Opposition
2010	Ted Baillieu	1,417,146	44.78%	45 / 88	▲13	1st	Majority
2014	Denis Napthine	1,409,282	42.00%	38 / 88	▼7	▼2nd	Opposition
2018	Matthew Guy	1,236,912	35.19	27 / 88	▼11	2nd	Opposition
2022	Matthew Guy	1,260,100	34.48	28 / 88	▲1	2nd	Opposition
