= Second Dunstan ministry =

51st ministry of the Government of Victoria

Second Dunstan Ministry
- 51st ministry of Victoria, Australia
- Date formed: 18 September 1943
- Date dissolved: 2 October 1945

People and organisations
- Monarch: George VI
- Governor: Sir Winston Dugan
- Premier: Albert Dunstan
- Deputy premier: Thomas Hollway
- No. of ministers: 12
- Member party: United Australia–Country Coalition
- Status in legislature: Coalition majority government
- Opposition party: Labor
- Opposition leaders: John Cain

History
- Election: 1943 state election
- Predecessor: First Cain ministry
- Successor: Macfarlan ministry

The Second Dunstan Ministry was the 51st ministry of the Government of Victoria. It was led by the Premier of Victoria, Albert Dunstan. The ministry was sworn in on 18 September 1943, just several days after the formation of the First Cain Ministry, and consisted of members of the Country Party and the United Australia Party (UAP) (later the Liberal Party from March 1945).

== Portfolios ==
| Party | Minister | Portfolios |
|---|---|---|
| Country | Albert Dunstan, MLA | Premier; Treasurer; Minister for Decentralisation |
| United Australia | Thomas Hollway, MLA | Deputy Premier; Minister of Public Instruction; Minister of Labour |
| Country | Albert Lind, MLA | Minister for Lands and Forests |
| Country | Herbert Hyland, MLA | Chief Secretary |
| Country | Norman Martin, MLA | Minister for Agriculture |
| Country | John McDonald, MLA | Minister for Water Supply; Minister in Charge of Electrical Undertakings |
| Country | John Lienhop, MLC | Minister for Works |
| United Australia | Ian MacFarlan, MLA | Attorney-General; Minister for Health |
| United Australia | James Kennedy, MLC | Minister of Transport; Minister of Mines |
| Country | George Tuckett, MLC | Ministers without Portfolio |
| Country | Trevor Oldham, MLA | Ministers without Portfolio |
| United Australia | Gilbert Chandler, MLC | Ministers without Portfolio |

Parliament of Victoria
| Preceded by First Cain Ministry | Second Dunstan Ministry; 1943–1945 | Succeeded by MacFarlan Ministry |
