= United Australia Party – Victoria =

- Abbreviation: UAP
- Leader: Sir Stanley Argyle (1931–40); Thomas Hollway (1940–45)
- Deputy Leader: Ian Macfarlan (1931–32; 1934–35); Robert Menzies (1932–34); Wilfrid Kent Hughes (1935–40); Thomas Hollway (1940)
- Founded: 15 September 1931; 94 years ago
- Dissolved: 5 March 1945; 80 years ago
- Preceded by: Nationalist Party
- Succeeded by: Liberal Party
- Political position: Centre-right
- National affiliation: United Australia Party
- Legislative Assembly: 31 / 65 (1932–1935)
- Legislative Council: 23 / 34 (1932–1934)

The United Australia Party (UAP) was the state branch of the national United Australia Party in Victoria. The party led the state government under Sir Stanley Argyle between 1932 and 1935, but spent most of its existence in opposition to the Country Party.

In September 1943, the party entered into a coalition government with the Country Party. (Note: The Country Party was officially known as the United Country Party (UCP) from September 1930 until March 1947, although it was still commonly referred to as the "Country Party".) The national UAP began to demise in the 1940s, and the UAP's state parliamentary members joined the newly-formed Liberal Party in March 1945.

== History ==
=== Foundation ===
On 7 May 1931, the Nationalist Party merged with the All for Australia League and the Australian Party to form the United Australia Party in the federal parliament.

The Victorian branch of the Nationalist Party, which was serving in opposition to the Labor government at the time, reflected this change several months later when it was renamed to the UAP on 15 September 1931. An attempt was made for the United Country Party (UCP) to merge with the UAP at the same time, but this was not successful.

=== Argyle government ===
At the 1932 state election, the UAP won 31 seats, just shy of the 33 needed for a majority. Following the election, the UAP formed a coalition with the UCP, with several UCP MPs serving in the ministry. UAP leader Sir Stanley Argyle was sworn in as Premier, replacing Labor's Edmond Hogan, and Robert Menzies served in the newly-formed position of Deputy Premier (replacing Ian Macfarlan as deputy UAP leader).

In 1934, Menzies resigned from the state parliament in order to contest the federal election, and Macfarlan returned to the deputy leadership. The UAP lost four seats at the state election on 2 March 1935 but remained the largest party in parliament, with Argyle returned as premier and UCP leader Albert Dunstan replacing Macfarlan as deputy premier. In a spill on 12 March 1935, Macfarlan lost his position and was replaced as UAP deputy leader by Wilfrid Kent Hughes.

At a meeting of the UCP's Central Council and its parliamentary members on 19 March 1935, the sudden decision was taken to end the coalition after Argle refused to give the UCP additional ministerial portfolios. Argyle was forced to form a new ministry composed entirely of UAP members, accusing the UCP of double-crossing and betraying the UAP.

On 29 March 1935, a motion of no confidence against the Argyle government was moved by Dunstan and supported by UCP and Labor MPs. Argyle resigned as Premier on 2 April 1935 and Dunstan was sworn in, forming a ministry composed of UCP MPs with the support of Labor in parliament.

=== Opposition and Country-Liberal faction ===
Now in opposition, the UAP suffered an internal split as Ian Macfarlan formed a "Country-Liberal" faction on 14 July 1936, which sat on the crossbench (although its members neither resigned nor were expelled from the UAP). The faction − which also included Harry Drew, Frederick Holden, Alfred Kirton, George Knox, Thomas Maltby and Clive Shields − reserved the right to support the Dunstan government on any measures that it approved, advocating conditional negotiation rather than rigid opposition.

The state election on 2 October 1937 saw the UAP again emerge as the largest party with 21 seats, but the UCP continued to form government with the support of Labor. Argyle was re-elected UAP leader following the election and the Country-Liberal faction was disbanded. The Country-Liberal MPs who remained in parliament returned to the UAP opposition benches, with the exception of Holden (who became an independent) and Macfarlan (who became an Independent Liberal). Macfarlan said he left the UAP because its Victorian branch was "controlled by an outside body", the members of which were unknown to the majority of the party's members.

Further losses for the UAP came at the 1940 state election, when its seats deceased to 16, and Labor's support of the UCP government remained in place. Argyle was returned as UAP leader, although only by a majority of two votes, while Thomas Hollway took over from Kent Hughes (who had enlisted in the Army) as deputy leader.

On 23 November 1940, Argyle died and was replaced as UAP leader by Hollway. James Dillon was seen as the frontrunner to become the new deputy leader, but with George Knox and Trevor Oldham also contesting the position, it was left vacant.

Macfarlan rejoined the UAP on 7 May 1943 and was endorsed as the party's candidate in his seat of Brighton.

=== Coalition government ===
The UAP was reduced to 13 seats after the 1943 state election. However, instead of being supported by Labor, it was the UAP that gave supply to the UCP.

On 10 September 1943, the Dunstan government was defeated on the floor of parliament after Labor MPs voted for a motion of no confidence brought forward by Hollway on the issue of electoral redistribution. Dunstan resigned as premier on 14 September, and Labor leader John Cain was sworn in.

Four days later on 18 September 1943, Dunstan was again sworn in as premier after the UCP formed a coalition government with the UAP, with members of the UAP serving in ministerial portfolios.

=== Disbandment ===
A Victorian division of the Liberal Party of Australia, which had been formed on 13 October 1944, was established between December 1944 and January 1945. The Victorian UAP branch and its parliamentary members joined the Liberal Party on 5 March 1945, with the state parliamentary UAP becoming the state parliamentary Liberal Party, prior to the national UAP being absorbed into the Liberal Party of Australia in October 1945.

== Leadership ==
=== Leaders ===
No.	Leader (birth–death)	Electorate	Term start	Term end	Time in office	Premier (term)
1	Sir Stanley Argyle (1867–1940)	Toorak	15 September 1931	23 November 1940	9 years, 69 days	Hogan (1929–1932)
1	Sir Stanley Argyle (1867–1940)	Toorak	15 September 1931	23 November 1940	9 years, 69 days	Himself (1932–1935)
1	Sir Stanley Argyle (1867–1940)	Toorak	15 September 1931	23 November 1940	9 years, 69 days	Dunstan (1935–1943)
2	Thomas Hollway (1906–1971)	Ballarat	3 December 1940	5 March 1945	4 years, 92 days	Dunstan (1935–1943)
2	Thomas Hollway (1906–1971)	Ballarat	3 December 1940	5 March 1945	4 years, 92 days	Cain (1943)
2	Thomas Hollway (1906–1971)	Ballarat	3 December 1940	5 March 1945	4 years, 92 days	Dunstan (1943–1945)

=== Deputy Leaders ===
No.	Leader (birth–death)	Electorate	Term start	Term end	Time in office	Leader (term)
1	Ian Macfarlan (1881–1964)	Brighton	15 September 1931	15 June 1932	274 days	Argyle (1931–1940)
2	Robert Menzies (1894–1978)	Nunawading	15 June 1932	31 July 1934	2 years, 46 days	Argyle (1931–1940)
(1)	Ian Macfarlan (1881–1964)	Brighton	31 July 1934	12 March 1935	224 days	Argyle (1931–1940)
3	Wilfrid Kent Hughes (1895–1970)	Kew	12 March 1935	24 April 1940	5 years, 43 days	Argyle (1931–1940)
4	Thomas Hollway (1906–1971)	Ballarat	24 April 1940	3 December 1940	223 days	Argyle (1931–1940)

== Election results ==
=== State elections ===
Election	Leader	Seats	±	Total votes	%	±%	Position
1932	Sir Stanley Argyle	31 / 65	▲13	271,778	40.12%	▲1.86	Coalition government
1935	Sir Stanley Argyle	25 / 65	▼7	303,626	36.17%	▼3.95	Opposition
1937	Sir Stanley Argyle	21 / 65	▼4	311,168	39.56%	▲3.39	Opposition
1940	Sir Stanley Argyle	16 / 65	▼5	274,113	35.41%	▼4.15	Opposition
1943	Thomas Hollway	13 / 65	▼4	198,582	12.34%	▼12.34	Opposition
