= Macfarlan ministry =

52nd ministry of Victoria, Australia

- 52nd ministry of Victoria, Australia
- Date formed: 2 October 1945
- Date dissolved: 21 November 1945

People and organisations
- Monarch: George VI
- Governor: Sir Winston Dugan
- Premier: Ian Macfarlan
- Deputy premier: Thomas Maltby
- No. of ministers: 10
- Member party: Liberal–Country Coalition
- Status in legislature: Coalition majority government
- Opposition party: Labor
- Opposition leader: John Cain

History
- Predecessor: Second Dunstan ministry
- Successor: Second Cain ministry

The Macfarlan Ministry was the 52nd ministry of the Government of Victoria. It was led by the Premier of Victoria, Ian Macfarlan and consisted of members of the Liberal Party, the Country Party and two Independents. The ministry was known as the "stop gap ministry", and was formed when a crisis developed over loss of supply to Albert Dunstan's government. The ministry was sworn in on 2 October 1945, and met in parliament once on 3 October for the sole purpose of passing the supply bill for the next two months. Once the supply bill was passed, the Governor of Victoria, Sir Winston Dugan, dissolved the parliament and issued writs for an election. Despite the short-lived parliament, Macfarlan's ministers retained their commissions until John Cain's ministry was sworn in on 21 November following Labor's election victory.

== Portfolios ==
Party	Minister	Portfolios
Liberal	Ian Macfarlan, MLA	Premier; Treasurer; Attorney-General; Solicitor-General
Liberal	Thomas Maltby, MLA	Deputy Premier; Chief Secretary; Minister in Charge of Electrical Undertakings
Liberal	William Haworth, MLA	Minister of Health; Minister of Housing
Liberal	William Cumming, MLA	Minister of Agriculture; Vice-President of the Board of Land and Works
Country	Edwin Mackrell, MLA	Minister of Water Supply; Minister of Decentralization
Independent	Leslie Hollins, MLA	Minister of Public Instruction; Minister of Labour
Liberal	William Everard, MLA	President of the Board of Land and Works; Commissioner of Crown Lands; Minister of Forests
Liberal	James Disney, MLC	Minister of Transport; Minister of Mines; Vice-President of the Board of Land and Works
Independent	Likely McBrien, MLC	Minister for Public Works
Liberal	Archie Michaelis, MLA	Minister without Portfolio

Parliament of Victoria
Preceded by Second Dunstan Ministry	Macfarlan Ministry; 1945	Succeeded by Second Cain Ministry
