= Liberal–National Coalition (disambiguation) =

The Liberal–National Coalition is an alliance of the Liberal Party of Australia and the National Party of Australia.

Liberal–National Coalition may also refer to:

- Liberal–National Coalition (New South Wales)
- Liberal–National Coalition (Victoria)
