= Leader of the Opposition (Victoria) =

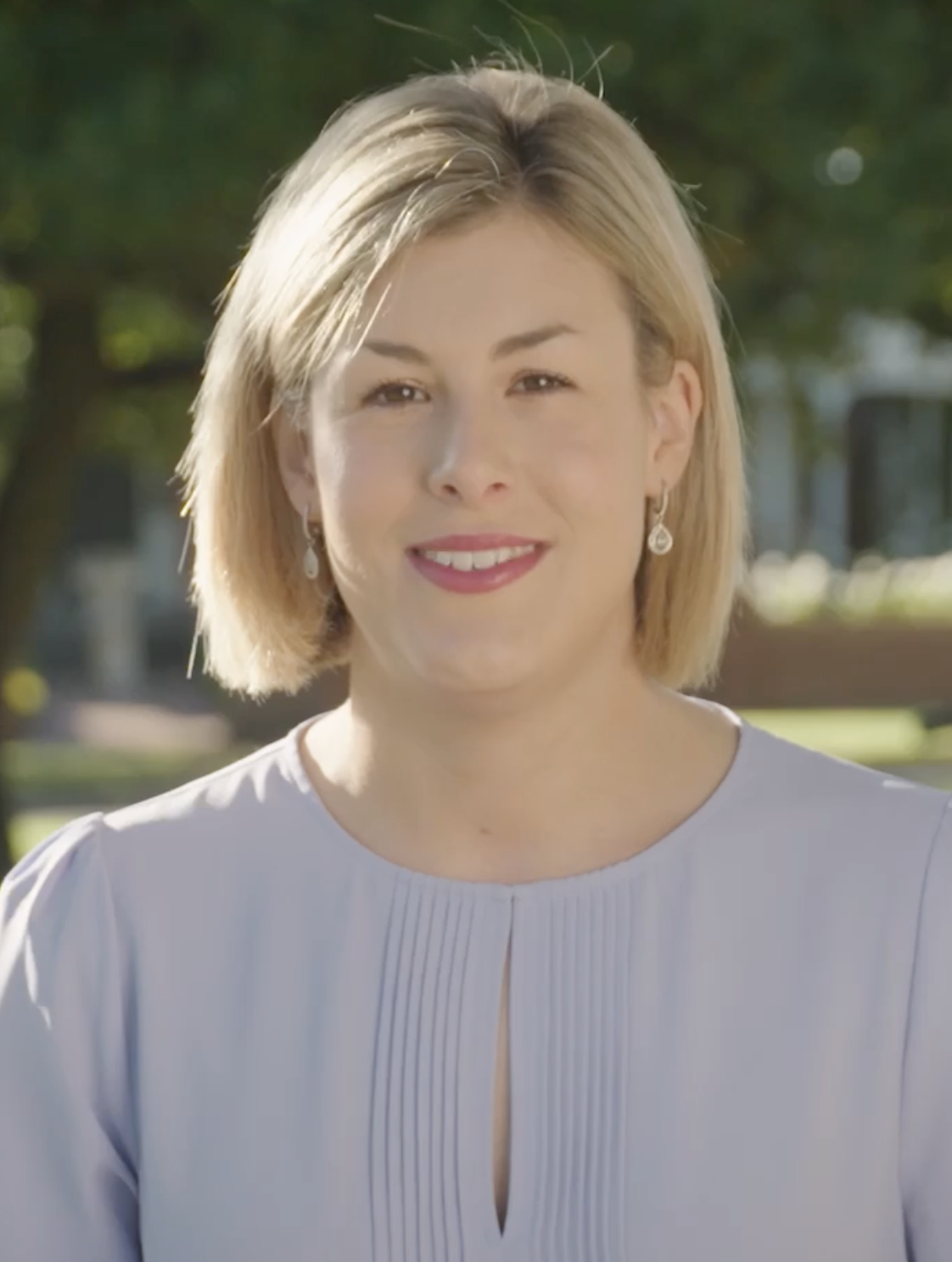
- Incumbent; Jess Wilson since 18 November 2025
- Term length: While leader of the largest political party not in government
- Inaugural holder: George Prendergast
- Formation: 1904
- Deputy: David Southwick

In Victoria, the leader of the Opposition is the leader of the largest political party in Parliament that is not in government. They are always a member of the Legislative Assembly.

Prior to 1904, opposition to the government of the day was less organised. Thus, the Victorian Parliamentary Record does not designate leaders of the opposition before then. The leader acts as the public face of the opposition, leading the opposition on the floor of parliament. They act as a chief critic of the government and ultimately attempt to portray the party in opposition as a feasible alternate government.

The office is currently held by Jess Wilson after her election to the position of leader of the Liberal Party on 18 November 2025.

== List of leaders of the opposition in Victoria ==
No.	Name	Portrait	Party	Constituency	Term of office		Tenure	Elections	Premier
1	George Prendergast		Labor	North Melbourne	7 June 1904	17 September 1913	9 years, 102 days	1904	Bent; 1904–1909
1	George Prendergast		Labor	North Melbourne	7 June 1904	17 September 1913	9 years, 102 days	1907	Bent; 1904–1909
1	George Prendergast		Labor	North Melbourne	7 June 1904	17 September 1913	9 years, 102 days	1908	Bent; 1904–1909
1	George Prendergast		Labor	North Melbourne	7 June 1904	17 September 1913	9 years, 102 days	1911	Murray; 1909–1912
1	George Prendergast		Labor	North Melbourne	7 June 1904	17 September 1913	9 years, 102 days	–	Watt; 1912–1913
2	George Elmslie		Labor	Albert Park	17 September 1913	9 December 1913	83 days	–	Watt; 1912–1913
3	William Watt		Commonwealth Liberal	Essendon	9 December 1913	22 December 1913	13 days	–	Elmslie; 1913
(2)	George Elmslie		Labor	Albert Park	22 December 1913	11 May 1918	4 years, 140 days	–	Watt; 1913–1914
(2)	George Elmslie		Labor	Albert Park	22 December 1913	11 May 1918	4 years, 140 days	1914	Peacock; 1914–1917
(2)	George Elmslie		Labor	Albert Park	22 December 1913	11 May 1918	4 years, 140 days	1917	Bowser; 1917–1918
(2)	George Elmslie		Labor	Albert Park	22 December 1913	11 May 1918	4 years, 140 days	–	Lawson; 1918–1924
(1)	George Prendergast		Labor	North Melbourne	18 June 1918	18 July 1924	6 years, 30 days	1920	Lawson; 1918–1924
(1)	George Prendergast		Labor	North Melbourne	18 June 1918	18 July 1924	6 years, 30 days	1921	Lawson; 1918–1924
(1)	George Prendergast		Labor	North Melbourne	18 June 1918	18 July 1924	6 years, 30 days	1924	Peacock; 1924
4	Alexander Peacock		Nationalist	Allandale	18 July 1924	18 November 1924	123 days	–	Prendergast; 1924
(1)	George Prendergast		Labor	North Melbourne	18 November 1924	14 April 1926	1 year, 147 days	–	Allan; 1924–1927
5	Edmond Hogan		Labor	Warrenheip	14 April 1926	20 May 1927	1 year, 36 days	1927	Allan; 1924–1927
6	William McPherson		Nationalist	Hawthorn	20 May 1927	22 November 1928	1 year, 186 days	–	Hogan; 1927–1928
(5)	Edmond Hogan		Labor	Warrenheip and Grenville	22 November 1928	12 December 1929	1 year, 20 days	1929	McPherson; 1928–1929
(6)	William McPherson		Nationalist	Hawthorn	12 December 1929	3 September 1930	265 days	–	Hogan; 1929–1932
7	Stanley Argyle		Nationalist	Toorak	3 September 1930	19 May 1932	1 year, 259 days	–	Hogan; 1929–1932
7	Stanley Argyle		United Australia	Toorak	3 September 1930	19 May 1932	1 year, 259 days	1932	Hogan; 1929–1932
8	Tom Tunnecliffe		Labor	Collingwood	13 July 1932	2 April 1935	2 years, 263 days	1935	Argyle; 1932–1935
(7)	Stanley Argyle		United Australia	Toorak	2 April 1935	23 November 1940	5 years, 235 days	1937	Dunstan; 1935–1943
(7)	Stanley Argyle		United Australia	Toorak	2 April 1935	23 November 1940	5 years, 235 days	1940	Dunstan; 1935–1943
9	Thomas Hollway		United Australia	Ballarat	23 November 1940	14 September 1943	2 years, 295 days	1943	Dunstan; 1935–1943
10	Albert Dunstan		United Country	Korong and Eaglehawk	14 September 1943	18 September 1943	4 days	–	Cain; 1943
11	John Cain		Labor	Northcote	18 September 1943	21 November 1945	2 years, 64 days	–	Dunstan; 1943–1945
11	John Cain		Labor	Northcote	18 September 1943	21 November 1945	2 years, 64 days	1945	Macfarlan; 1945
12	John McDonald		United Country	Shepparton	21 November 1945	20 November 1947	1 year, 364 days	1947	Cain; 1945–1947
(11)	John Cain		Labor	Northcote	20 November 1947	7 December 1948	1 year, 17 days	–	Hollway; 1947–1950
(12)	John McDonald		Country	Shepparton	7 December 1948	27 June 1950	1 year, 202 days	1950	Hollway; 1947–1950
(9)	Thomas Hollway		Liberal and Country	Ballarat	27 June 1950	5 December 1951	1 year, 161 days	–	McDonald; 1950–1952
13	Les Norman		Liberal and Country	Glen Iris	5 December 1951	23 July 1952	231 days	–	McDonald; 1950–1952
(11)	John Cain		Labor	Northcote	23 July 1952	17 December 1952	147 days	–	McDonald; 1950–1952
(11)	John Cain		Labor	Northcote	23 July 1952	17 December 1952	147 days	–	Hollway; 1952
(11)	John Cain		Labor	Northcote	23 July 1952	17 December 1952	147 days	1952	McDonald; 1952
14	Trevor Oldham		Liberal and Country	Malvern	17 December 1952	2 May 1953	136 days	–	Cain; 1952–1955
15	Henry Bolte		Liberal and Country	Hampden	3 June 1953	7 June 1955	2 years, 4 days	1955	Cain; 1952–1955
(11)	John Cain		Labor	Northcote	8 June 1955	4 August 1957	2 years, 57 days	–	Bolte; 1955–1972
16	Ernie Shepherd		Labor	Ascot Vale; Footscray	20 August 1957	12 September 1958	1 year, 23 days	1958	Bolte; 1955–1972
17	Clive Stoneham		Labor	Midlands	7 October 1958	15 May 1967	8 years, 220 days	1961	Bolte; 1955–1972
17	Clive Stoneham		Labor	Midlands	7 October 1958	15 May 1967	8 years, 220 days	1964	Bolte; 1955–1972
17	Clive Stoneham		Labor	Midlands	7 October 1958	15 May 1967	8 years, 220 days	1967	Bolte; 1955–1972
18	Clyde Holding		Labor	Richmond	15 May 1967	29 June 1977	10 years, 45 days	1970	Bolte; 1955–1972
18	Clyde Holding		Labor	Richmond	15 May 1967	29 June 1977	10 years, 45 days	1973	Hamer; 1972–1981
18	Clyde Holding		Labor	Richmond	15 May 1967	29 June 1977	10 years, 45 days	1976	Hamer; 1972–1981
19	Frank Wilkes		Labor	Northcote	29 June 1977	9 September 1981	4 years, 72 days	1979	Hamer; 1972–1981
19	Frank Wilkes		Labor	Northcote	29 June 1977	9 September 1981	4 years, 72 days	–	Thompson; 1981–1982
20	John Cain		Labor	Bundoora	9 September 1981	8 April 1982	211 days	1982	Thompson; 1981–1982
21	Lindsay Thompson		Liberal	Malvern	8 April 1982	5 November 1982	211 days	–	Cain; 1982–1990
22	Jeff Kennett		Liberal	Burwood	5 November 1982	23 May 1989	6 years, 199 days	1985	Cain; 1982–1990
22	Jeff Kennett		Liberal	Burwood	5 November 1982	23 May 1989	6 years, 199 days	1988	Cain; 1982–1990
23	Alan Brown		Liberal	Gippsland West	23 May 1989	23 April 1991	1 year, 335 days	–	Cain; 1982–1990
23	Alan Brown		Liberal	Gippsland West	23 May 1989	23 April 1991	1 year, 335 days	–	Kirner; 1990–1992
(22)	Jeff Kennett		Liberal	Burwood	23 April 1991	6 October 1992	1 year, 166 days	1992	Kirner; 1990–1992
24	Joan Kirner		Labor	Williamstown	6 October 1992	22 March 1993	167 days	–	Kennett; 1992–1999
25	Jim Kennan		Labor	Broadmeadows	22 March 1993	29 June 1993	99 days	–	Kennett; 1992–1999
26	John Brumby		Labor	Broadmeadows	14 July 1993	22 March 1999	5 years, 251 days	1996	Kennett; 1992–1999
27	Steve Bracks		Labor	Williamstown	22 March 1999	20 October 1999	212 days	1999	Kennett; 1992–1999
(22)	Jeff Kennett		Liberal	Burwood	20 October 1999	26 October 1999	6 days	–	Bracks; 1999–2007
28	Denis Napthine		Liberal	Portland	26 October 1999	20 August 2002	2 years, 298 days	–	Bracks; 1999–2007
29	Robert Doyle		Liberal	Malvern	20 August 2002	8 May 2006	3 years, 261 days	2002	Bracks; 1999–2007
30	Ted Baillieu		Liberal	Hawthorn	8 May 2006	2 December 2010	4 years, 208 days	2006	Bracks; 1999–2007
30	Ted Baillieu		Liberal	Hawthorn	8 May 2006	2 December 2010	4 years, 208 days	2010	Brumby; 2007–2010
31	Daniel Andrews		Labor	Mulgrave	3 December 2010	4 December 2014	4 years, 1 day	–	Baillieu; 2010–2013
31	Daniel Andrews		Labor	Mulgrave	3 December 2010	4 December 2014	4 years, 1 day	2014	Napthine; 2013–2014
32	Matthew Guy		Liberal	Bulleen	4 December 2014	6 December 2018	4 years, 2 days	2018	Andrews; 2014–2023
33	Michael O'Brien		Liberal	Malvern	6 December 2018	7 September 2021	2 years, 275 days	–	Andrews; 2014–2023
(32)	Matthew Guy		Liberal	Bulleen	7 September 2021	8 December 2022	1 year, 92 days	2022	Andrews; 2014–2023
34	John Pesutto		Liberal	Hawthorn	8 December 2022	27 December 2024	3 years, 344 days	–	Andrews; 2014–2023
34	John Pesutto		Liberal	Hawthorn	8 December 2022	27 December 2024	3 years, 344 days	–	Allan; 2023–2026
35	Brad Battin		Liberal	Berwick	27 December 2024	18 November 2025	326 days	–	Allan; 2023–2026
36	Jess Wilson		Liberal	Kew	18 November 2025	Incumbent	364 days	–	Allan; 2023–2026
36	Jess Wilson		Liberal	Kew	18 November 2025	Incumbent	364 days	–	Carroll; 2026-
