= Argyle ministry =

48th ministry of Victoria, Australia

- 48th ministry of Victoria, Australia
- Date formed: 19 May 1932
- Date dissolved: 2 April 1935

People and organisations
- Monarch: George V
- Governor: Lord Huntingfield (from 14 May 1934) (Note: Before this date the Governor was Lieutenant-Governor Sir William Irvine)
- Premier: Stanley Argyle
- Deputy premier: Robert Menzies (to 31 July 1934); Ian Macfarlan (31 July 1934 to 12 March 1935); Albert Dunstan (15 March 1935 to 20 March 1935); Wilfrid Kent Hughes (from 20 March 1935)
- No. of ministers: 12
- Member party: United Australia–Country Coalition (until 20 March 1935); United Australia (from 20 March 1935)
- Status in legislature: Minority government
- Opposition party: Labor
- Opposition leader: Tom Tunnecliffe

History
- Elections: 1932 state election 1935 state election
- Predecessor: Second Hogan ministry
- Successor: First Dunstan ministry

The Argyle Ministry was the 48th ministry of the Government of Victoria. It was led by the Premier of Victoria, Stanley Argyle, and consisted of members of the United Australia Party (UAP) and the Country Party. The ministry was sworn in on 19 May 1932. On the 20th of March 1935, following the 1935 election, the Country party withdrew from the Coalition. Argyle then formed a new ministry of UAP members. The ministry was dissolved as a result of Argyle's resignation following defeat in the Legislative Assembly.

== First Ministry (19 May 1932 to 20 March 1935) ==
Party	Minister	Portfolio
United Australia	Stanley Argyle, MLA	Premier; Treasurer; Minister of Public Health
United Australia	Robert Menzies, MLA (to 31 July 1934)	Deputy Premier; Attorney-General (to 25 July 1934); Solicitor-General (to 25 July 1934); Minister of Railways (to 25 July 1934)
United Australia	Ian Macfarlan, MLA	Deputy Premier (31 July 1934 to 12 March 1935); Chief Secretary; Minister in Charge of Electrical Undertakings (to 25 July 1934); Attorney-General (from 25 July 1934); Solicitor-General (from 25 July 1934)
Country	Albert Dunstan, MLA	Deputy Premier (from 15 March 1935); President of the Board of Land and Works; Commissioner of Crown Lands and Survey; Minister of Forests
Country	John Allan, MLA	Minister of Agriculture; Vice-President of the Board of Land and Works
United Australia	John Pennington, MLA	Minister of Public Instruction
United Australia	John Jones, MLC	Commissioner of Public Works; Minister in Charge of Immigration; Minister of Mines; Vice-President of the Board of Land and Works
Country	George Goudie, MLC	Minister of Water Supply; Vice-President of the Board of Land and Works; Minister of Labour (to 25 July 1934); Minister in Charge of Electrical Undertakings (from 25 July 1934)
United Australia	Wilfrid Kent Hughes, MLA	Minister without Portfolio (to 25 July 1934); Minister of Railways (from 25 July 1934); Minister of Labour (from 25 July 1934); Vice-President of the Board of Land and Works (from 25 July 1934)
United Australia	Alfred Chandler, MLC	Ministers without Portfolio
United Australia	Harold Cohen, MLC	Ministers without Portfolio
United Australia	Thomas Manifold, MLA	Ministers without Portfolio
United Australia	Thomas Maltby, MLA (from 25 July 1934)	Ministers without Portfolio

== Second Ministry (20 March 1935 to 2 April 1935) ==
Minister	Portfolio
Stanley Argyle, MLA	Premier; Treasurer; Minister of Public Health
Wilfrid Kent Hughes, MLA	Deputy Premier; Minister of Railways; Minister of Labour; Vice-President of the Board of Land and Works
Ian Macfarlan, MLA	Chief Secretary; Attorney-General
John Jones, MLC	Commissioner of Public Works; Minister in Charge of Immigration; Vice-President of the Board of Land and Works
Harold Cohen, MLC	Minister of Public Instruction; Solicitor-General
Clive Shields, MLA	Minister of Agriculture; Minister of Mines; Vice-President of the Board of Land and Works
Thomas Maltby, MLA	Commissioner of Crown Lands and Survey; President of the Board of Land and Works; Minister of Forests
Henry Cohen, MLC	Minister of Water Supply; Minister in Charge of Electrical Undertakings
Marcus Saltau, MLC	Ministers without Portfolio
Clifden Eager, MLC	Ministers without Portfolio
George Knox, MLA	Ministers without Portfolio
John Gray, MLA	Ministers without Portfolio

== Notes ==
Parliament of Victoria
Preceded by Second Hogan Ministry	Argyle Ministry; 1932-1935	Succeeded by First Dunstan Ministry
