= First Dunstan ministry (Victoria) =

49th ministry of Victoria, Australia

- 49th ministry of Victoria, Australia
- Date formed: 2 April 1935
- Date dissolved: 14 September 1943

People and organisations
- Monarch: George V (until 20 January 1936); Edward VIII (20 January 1936 to 11 December 1936); George VI (from 11 December 1936)
- Governor: Lord Huntingfield (until 4 April 1939); Sir Winston Dugan (from 17 July 1939) (Note: Between the end of Lord Huntingfield's Governorship and the appointment of Sir Dugan, the Governor was Lieutenant-Governor Sir Frederick Mann)
- Premier: Albert Dunstan
- Deputy premier: Murray Bourchier (until 24 June 1936); Francis Old (24 June 1936 to 14 October 1937); Albert Lind (from 14 October 1937)
- No. of ministers: 10
- Member party: United Country
- Status in legislature: Minority government
- Opposition party: United Australia
- Opposition leader: Stanley Argyle (until 23 November 1940); Thomas Hollway (from 23 November 1940)

History
- Elections: 1937 state election 1940 state election 1943 state election
- Predecessor: Argyle ministry
- Successor: First Cain ministry

The First Dunstan Ministry was the 49th ministry of the Government of Victoria. It was led by the Premier of Victoria, Albert Dunstan. The ministry was sworn in on 2 April 1935, and was the first United Country Party ministry in the history of Victoria.

== Portfolios ==
Minister	Portfolios
Albert Dunstan, MLA	Premier; Treasurer; Solicitor-General (from 23 April 1938); Minister of Decentralisation (from 1 March 1943)
Murray Bourchier, MLA (to 24 June 1936)	Deputy Premier; Chief Secretary (to 22 June 1936); Minister of Labour (to 22 June 1936)
Francis Old, MLA	Deputy Premier (24 June 1936 to 14 October 1937); Minister for Water Supply; Minister in Charge of Electrical Undertakings
Albert Lind, MLA	Deputy Premier (from 14 October 1937); Commissioner of Crown Lands and Survey (to 1 January 1942); President of the Board of Land and Works (to 1 January 1942); Minister for Lands and Forests; Minister of Public Instruction (from 8 January 1942)
Edmond Hogan, MLA (to 28 June 1943)	Minister for Agriculture; Minister of Mines; Vice-President of the Board of Land and Works
Albert Bussau, MLA (to 18 April 1938)	Minister of Transport; Attorney-General; Solicitor-General
Sir John Harris, MLC (to 1 January 1942)	Minister for Education; Minister of Public Health
Sir George Goudie, MLC	Minister for Public Works; Minister in Charge of Immigration; Vice-President of the Board of Land and Works
George Tuckett, MLC	Minister without Portfolio (to 8 January 1942); Commissioner of Crown Lands and Survey (from 8 January 1942); President of the Board of Land and Works (from 8 January 1942)
Henry Pye, MLC (to 9 April 1942)	Minister without Portfolio
Henry Bailey, MLA	Minister without Portfolio (to 22 June 1936); Chief Secretary (from 22 June 1936); Minister of Labour (22 June 1936 to 29 July 1936); Attorney-General (from 27 April 1938)
Edwin Mackrell, MLA	Minister without Portfolio (to 29 July 1936); Minister of Labour (from 29 July 1936); Minister of Public Health (from 8 January 1942)
Herbert Hyland, MLA	Minister without Portfolio (22 June 1936 to 27 April 1938); Minister of Transport (22 June 1936 to 27 April 1938); Vice-President of the Board of Land and Works (22 June 1936 to 27 April 1938)
Norman Martin, MLA	Minister without Portfolio (27 April 1938 to 28 June 1943); Minister for Agriculture (from 28 June 1943); Minister of Mines (from 28 June 1943); Vice-President of the Board of Land and Works (from 28 June 1943)
Leonard Rodda, MLC	Minister without Portfolio (8 January 1942 to 20 July 1943)
John Lienhop, MLC	Minister without Portfolio (from 29 April 1942)
John McDonald, MLA	Minister without Portfolio (from 28 June 1943)

== Notes ==
Parliament of Victoria
Preceded by Argyle Ministry	First Dunstan Ministry; 1935–1943	Succeeded by First Cain Ministry
