= First Dunstan ministry =

First Dunstan ministry may refer to:

- First Dunstan ministry (South Australia) (1967–1968), the 61st ministry of the Government of South Australia, led by Don Dunstan
- First Dunstan ministry (Victoria) (1935–1943), the 49th ministry of the Government of Victoria, led by Albert Dunstan
