= Wilfrid Kent Hughes =

Australian army officer and politician (1895–1970)

The Honourable Sir Wilfrid Kent Hughes KBE, MVO, MC
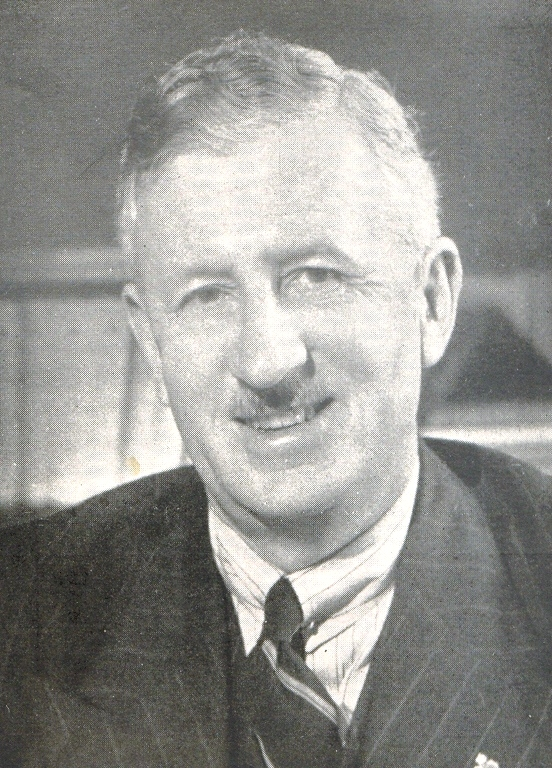
- Sir Wilfrid Kent Hughes in 1953

Minister for the Interior
- In office 11 May 1951 – 11 January 1956
- Prime Minister: Robert Menzies
- Preceded by: Eric Harrison
- Succeeded by: Allen Fairhall

Minister for Works
- In office 4 June 1952 – 11 January 1956
- Prime Minister: Robert Menzies
- Preceded by: (new title)
- Succeeded by: Allen Fairhall

Minister for Works and Housing
- In office 11 May 1951 – 4 June 1952
- Prime Minister: Robert Menzies
- Preceded by: Richard Casey
- Succeeded by: (abolished)

Member of the Australian Parliament for Division of Chisholm
- In office 10 December 1949 – 31 July 1970
- Preceded by: New seat
- Succeeded by: Tony Staley

4th Deputy Premier of Victoria
- In office 3 December 1948 – 28 October 1949
- Premier: Thomas Hollway
- Preceded by: John McDonald
- Succeeded by: Trevor Oldham
- In office 20 March 1935 – 2 April 1935
- Premier: Sir Stanley Argyle
- Preceded by: Albert Dunstan
- Succeeded by: Murray Bourchier

Deputy Leader of the United Australia Party in Victoria
- In office 12 March 1935 – 24 April 1940
- Preceded by: Ian Macfarlan
- Succeeded by: Thomas Hollway

Member of the Victorian Parliament for Kew
- In office 9 April 1927 – 31 October 1949
- Preceded by: New seat
- Succeeded by: Arthur Rylah

Personal details
- Born: 12 June 1895 East Melbourne, Victoria, Australia
- Died: 31 July 1970 (aged 75) Kew, Victoria, Australia
- Party: Nationalist (to 1931); UAP (1931–45); Liberal (from 1945)
- Spouse: Edith Kerr (m. 1923)
- Children: 3
- Education: University of Oxford

Military service
- Allegiance: Australia
- Branch/service: Australian Army
- Years of service: 1914–1918; 1939–1945
- Rank: Colonel
- Battles/wars: First World War; Gallipoli campaign; Sinai and Palestine campaign; Second World War; Battle of Malaya; Battle of Singapore
- Awards: Knight Commander of the Order of the British Empire; Member of the Royal Victorian Order; Military Cross; Mentioned in Despatches (4)
- Sports career
- Sport: Athletics
- Event: hurdles
- Club: University of Oxford AC; Achilles Club

Sir Wilfrid Selwyn "Bill" Kent Hughes (12 June 1895 – 31 July 1970) was an Australian army officer and politician who had a long career in both state and federal politics, most notably as a minister in the Menzies government. He also had a longstanding involvement with the Olympic movement, as both an athlete and organiser.

Kent Hughes was born in Melbourne to an upper middle-class family. He won a Rhodes Scholarship in 1914, but postponed his studies to join the Australian Imperial Force. He entered Christ Church, Oxford, in 1919, and combined his studies with his sporting career, representing Australia in hurdling at the 1920 Summer Olympics. Kent Hughes returned home in 1923 and began working at his father's publishing company. He was elected to the Victorian Legislative Assembly in 1927, representing the Nationalist Party. He joined the new United Australia Party in 1931, and the following year was made a minister in the government of Stanley Argyle. He served as the party's deputy leader from 1935 to 1939.

When the Second World War broke out, Kent Hughes re-enlisted in the army and took part in the Malayan campaign. He was captured by the Japanese at the Battle of Singapore, and spent the next three years as a prisoner-of-war in Singapore, Taiwan, and Manchuria. Kent Hughes retained his seat in parliament during that time, and joined the new Liberal Party upon his return to Australia in 1945. He became Deputy Premier of Victoria in 1948, but resigned the following year to contest the House of Representatives at the 1949 federal election. Robert Menzies added Kent Hughes to his cabinet in 1951, as Minister for the Interior and Minister for Works and Housing.

Kent Hughes was Chairman of the Organising Committee for the 1956 Melbourne Olympics. His chairmanship was widely judged a success, and he left a lasting legacy by engineering the sale of television rights, an Olympic first. Despite his high profile, Menzies removed Kent Hughes from his ministry in early 1956. He spent the rest of his career as a backbencher, dying in office in 1970. Kent Hughes was famous for his stubbornness and abrasive personality, particularly the insults he directed at opponents. He was sympathetic towards fascism early in his career (generally overlooked due to his later status as a war hero), and later became an ardent anti-communist.

== Early life and family ==
The second child of seven of English orthopaedic surgeon and publisher Wilfred Kent Hughes and his wife Clementina (née Rankin), through whom he was the first cousin of the academic and lawyer Philip Seaforth James. Kent Hughes was born in East Melbourne and educated at Trinity Grammar and Melbourne Grammar. He was accepted at Christ Church, Oxford as a Rhodes Scholar in 1914 (although he did not commence study at Oxford until 1919 due to his war service). The family name was Hughes, and young Wilfrid was usually called Bill or Billy. Later, to avoid confusion with fellow politician Billy Hughes, he adopted one of his middle names, Kent, as part of his surname. It is not known why he spelled his given name "Wilfrid" while his father's was "Wilfred."

A number of Kent Hughes's relatives also gained national recognition in their chosen fields. Uncle Canon Ernest Hughes was an influential member of the Anglican Church of Australia and a leading Australian rules footballer with St Kilda and Essendon and uncle Frederic Hughes was a Brigadier-General, mayor of St Kilda and Aide-de-camp to the Governor-General, the Earl of Dudley. Aunt Eva Hughes OBE founded the Australian Women's National League, the then largest body of organised women in the country, while his sisters Dr Ellen Kent Hughes MBE was a leading paediatrician and community activist and Gwendoline Kent Lloyd, who Wilfrid referred to as "the family Communist", was a renowned proponent of Indigenous rights.

== First World War ==
Kent Hughes enlisted in the Australian Imperial Force as a private on 8 August 1914. He served in the 3rd Light Horse Brigade at Gallipoli, where he was wounded, then Sinai, Palestine and Syria. Kent Hughes, who reached the rank of major, was mentioned in despatches four times, received the Military Cross in 1917 for his "marked ability and energy in the performance of his duties", and appointed Deputy Adjutant and Quartermaster General of the Australian Mounted Division. Upon his return to Australia in 1918 he published a volume of memoirs, Modern Crusaders, about his exploits in the Light Horse Brigade.

== University and 1920 Olympics ==
At war's end, Kent Hughes entered Christ Church, Oxford as a Rhodes Scholar, gaining a Bachelor of Arts with Honours in Modern History. He also captained the Oxford ski team and showed a proficiency for athletics and finished third behind Edward Wheller in the 440 yards hurdles event at the British 1920 AAA Championships. One month later, he was selected by Australia to compete at the 1920 Summer Olympics in Antwerp, Belgium. He finished fourth in his heat of the 110-metre hurdles and failed to progress but won his 400-metre heat before finishing fifth in the semi-final. Kent Hughes did not return to England empty handed, as he later admitted to souveniring an official Olympic flag from the Olympic stadium.

In 1921, Kent Hughes was part of the Oxford Ski Team visit to Europe, during which he became the first Australian to ski competitively overseas. He won the 440 yards AAA title at the 1922 AAA Championships.

Following his graduation from Oxford, he married Edith Kerr, a wealthy American heiress to a thread manufacturing empire, on 3 February 1923 in Montclair, New Jersey. He subsequently returned to Melbourne to work as a director in his father's publishing company Ramsay Publishing Pty Ltd while sizing up a career in politics.

== State politics ==
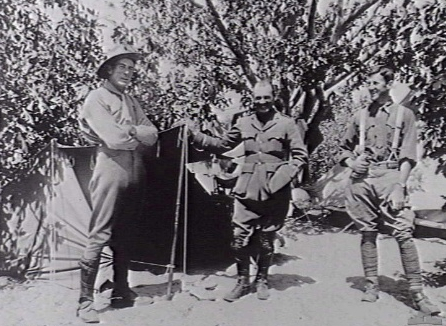
Major Kent Hughes (right) in Palestine with the 3rd Light Horse Brigade.

In 1926, Kent Hughes unsuccessfully sought Nationalist Party of Australia preselection for the newly created seat of Kew in the Victorian Legislative Assembly. He won the seat as an independent candidate at the 1927 election, after which he joined the Nationalists. Kent Hughes soon found himself opposed to the conservative establishment, and what he considered the mediocrity of Victorian politics. He openly referred to a number of his fellow Nationalists as "boneheads" and opposition Labor Party members as "uncouth, semi-educated ill-mannered narrow-minded boors". Kent Hughes, along with his close friend and ally Robert Menzies, founded the Young Nationalists Organisation in 1929, which became an influential force in conservative politics in Victoria.

When the Nationalists came into power in Victoria in December 1928, Kent Hughes was appointed Cabinet Secretary and Government Whip but resigned his positions in July 1929, ostensibly in protest over a government subsidy to a freezing works company, but more likely in reaction to the ongoing bone headedness of his fellow parliamentarians.

Following the formation of the United Australia Party (UAP) in place of the Nationalists in 1931, Kent Hughes served in several portfolios, including Railways, Labour, Transport and Sustenance. It was as Minister for Sustenance, a portfolio designed to deal with the poverty of the Great Depression, that he became known as the "Minister for Starvation". Kent Hughes drafted legislation that became the Unemployment Relief (Administration) Bill which, when enacted in January 1933, forced the unemployed to work for the dole, and denied any form of financial assistance to women. Kent Hughes's bill has been described as the harshest piece of legislation in Australia directed towards the unemployed during the Depression.

In January 1933, Kent Hughes became embroiled in cricket's Bodyline affair. A friend of English captain Douglas Jardine from their Oxford days, Kent Hughes publicly defended Jardine's tactics of sustained short-pitched bowling against the Australian batsmen, arguing that Australia used similar tactics against England during the 1921 Ashes tour. He also criticised the protests about Jardine by Australian cricket's governing body, the Australian Cricket Board of Control, stating they were "boorish, bitter (and) insulting".

While he was attacking the Cricket Board of Control, Kent Hughes was simultaneously organising the Australian tour of the Duke of Gloucester and, for his efforts, was appointed a Member of the Royal Victorian Order in 1934. In 1938, he was manager of the Australian team at the Empire Games held in Sydney.

=== "Why I Have Become a Fascist" ===
The "Why I have Become a Fascist" article

During the late 1920s and 1930s, Kent Hughes developed a strong sympathy for fascism, encouraged in part by his uncle Ernest, who visited Italy in 1926, and published an enthusiastic report on Mussolini's Italy in a local newspaper on his return. Kent Hughes was also impressed by Sir Oswald Mosley's proposal for a British parliament consisting of business and national interests, headed by a powerful executive government.

In 1933, he published a series of articles in the Melbourne Herald, titled "Why I Have Become a Fascist". In one article, he wrote that fascism "endeavours to avoid the egotistical attitude of laissez faire and the inertia of socialism". Kent Hughes saw it as "a half-way house between the two systems". In fascist countries, he said, "industrial peace and security have been found to be worth the price of sacrificing some of the individual liberty previously enjoyed". In what he called "British communities", however, he expected that fascism would "be garbed not in the dictatorial black shirt, but in the more sedate style of the British Parliamentary representative".

Kent Hughes was unique among prominent Australians in publicly identifying as a fascist, although he never joined a fascist organisation or acted overtly in a way that could be described as fascist, and there is no evidence to suggest he was an anti-semite. His biographer, Frederick Howard, maintains that Kent Hughes did not know much about fascism and used the word mainly for its shock value. He observed that "Kent Hughes does not seem to have paid enough attention to the difference between theory and practice in Mussolini's Italy".

Kent Hughes's public support of fascism failed to damage his political career, and he was elected as the deputy leader of the Victorian UAP in 1935, serving until his enlistment in the army in 1939.

== Second World War and aftermath ==
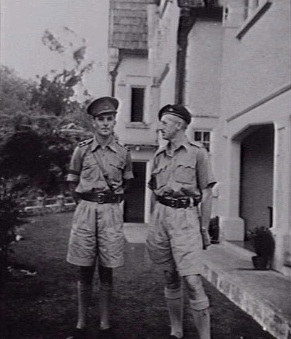
Lieutenant Colonel Kent Hughes (right) with his Aide de Camp Gordon Walker (left) in Kuala Lumpur, 1941

In 1939, without resigning from Parliament, Kent Hughes rejoined the army, becoming a colonel in the 8th Division. He served in the Malaya campaign of 1942, where he was again mentioned in despatches. Kent Hughes was taken prisoner by the Japanese in Singapore and was kept in the Changi Prisoner of War camp, where he was beaten and half-starved. In 1943 he was shipped as a slave labourer to Taiwan. In October 1944 he was shipped to Japan and on to Korea, and then sent by rail to Mukden in Manchuria, where prisoners of war were put to work in arms factories. In August 1945 Kent Hughes was liberated by the invading Red Army and returned to Australia with an amoebic complaint that would continue to bother him. While imprisoned, Kent Hughes secretly wrote what became Slaves of the Samurai, a colourful account of his wartime experiences, published in 1946. He also took up the case of Australian General Gordon Bennett, who was accused of cowardice and desertion after leaving Singapore without authorisation shortly before the city surrendered to the Japanese. Kent Hughes appeared before the Royal Commission into Bennett's case, and argued that Bennett was correct to avoid being taken prisoner and return to Australia to continue the fight.

Appointed an Officer of the Order of the British Empire in 1947 for his wartime service, Kent Hughes was very popular with the ex-service community, appearing in the ANZAC Day march in April each year on horseback, in his First World War uniform, and campaigning for improved benefits for ex-servicemen, particularly ex-prisoners of war. He returned to politics after the end of the Second World War and followed most of the UAP into the newly created Liberal Party. He served as Deputy Premier, Minister of Transport and Minister of Public Instruction from 1947 to 1949, as well as Chief Secretary and Minister for Electrical Undertakings in 1948.

== Federal politics ==
In 1949, Kent Hughes decided to transfer to federal politics. The bulk of his state electorate was within the comfortably safe Liberal federal seat of Kooyong, but that was held by his old colleague Menzies, now the federal leader of the Liberal Party. Instead, Kent Hughes opted to stand in Chisholm, a newly created seat in south-east Melbourne that was just as safe as Kooyong. Duly elected, he was appointed Minister for the Interior and Minister for Works and Housing (Minister for Works from June 1952) under Menzies. Kent Hughes complained that he was left in charge of only trifling issues.

=== 1956 Olympics ===
Following the successful bid by Melbourne to host the 1956 Summer Olympics, problems had beset the organising of the Games to the extent that International Olympic Committee President Avery Brundage threatened to award the Games to another city. In response, the Melbourne Organising Committee approached Kent Hughes in 1951 to be its chairman, believing his public stature, Olympian background and experience in administration would be great assets.

Kent Hughes took to the Chairman role with gusto, although his relationship with Brundage was never cordial. During a visit to Melbourne in 1955 to inspect the preparations, Brundage was less than impressed with the progress achieved under Kent Hughes's chairmanship and condemned Kent Hughes's apparent lack of concern at the looming deadline for the Games. Not one to take criticism lightly, Kent Hughes was quoted as saying that he had enough to worry about without having "Chicago blow-ins come out here and blow their tops over nothing in particular and annoy everyone in general."

Kent Hughes broke Olympic tradition in two significant ways. He decided to charge for television and newsreel footage of the Games where previously footage was provided free of charge. Secondly, following a suggestion from John Ian Wing, a 17-year-old apprentice carpenter from Melbourne, Kent Hughes instigated the now familiar closing ceremony tradition of the athletes of different nations parading together, instead of with their national teams, as a symbol of world unity. Kent Hughes's plan to charge for television and newsreel footage of the Games was strongly opposed in many circles, including the media, who believed that the Games were news and as such should be free, while Australian government authorities thought that providing free television coverage of the Games would lead to greater tourism opportunities. Brundage made no public comment on television rights for the Games but grasped the financial possibilities of charging for rights, devising a television rights fees policy following the Games, whereby television stations were forced to negotiate for televised rights for all future Games. This policy is believed to have netted the IOC over $12 billion since its inception at the 1960 Summer Olympics.

In recognition of his work successfully organising the Games Kent Hughes was made a Knight Commander of the Order of the British Empire in 1957. An award presented by the Victorian Olympic Council to the athlete it considers to have given the most outstanding performance at a Games is named in his honour and Kent Hughes's significance to the modern Olympic movement is such that it has been suggested that an oil portrait of Kent Hughes be commissioned and placed in the Olympic Museum in Lausanne.

=== Later years ===
Menzies dropped Kent Hughes from cabinet in 1956, ostensibly because Menzies opposed some of his housing plans for Canberra. However, it was more likely due to Kent Hughes's continued public comments on foreign affairs and defence matters, in which he took an independent line, favouring a policy even more anti-Communist than that of Menzies, higher defence spending, and the reintroduction of conscription. Widely renowned as the parliamentary figure most knowledgeable in Asian affairs, Kent Hughes was a leading member of the "Taiwan lobby" in the Liberal Party, which sought to maintain the recognition of the Nationalist government in Taiwan as the official Chinese government, and met several times with its president, Chiang Kai-shek. Following the unexpected death of Prime Minister Harold Holt in 1967, Kent Hughes was one of a number of Liberal politicians who expressed support for Country Party leader (and acting Prime Minister) John McEwen remaining Prime Minister ahead of any of his fellow Liberal Party parliamentarians. As it turned out, Liberal Party member John Gorton was elected as the new Liberal parliamentary leader and Prime Minister.

Kent Hughes remained very popular in his electorate, and served in Parliament until his death in 1970. Survived by his wife and three daughters, he was accorded a State Funeral. The Times obituary highlighted his war service and Olympian status, referring to him as "one of the more colourful Australian parliamentarians".

== Sources ==
- Abjorensen, N. (2016) The Manner of Their Going, Australian Scholarly Publishing: Kew. ISBN 978 1 925333 21 3.
- Hancock, I. (2002) John Gorton: He Did It His Way, Hodder: Sydney. ISBN 0-7336-1439-6.

Political offices
Preceded by Eric Harrison	Minister for the Interior; 1951–1956	Succeeded by Allen Fairhall
Preceded by Richard Casey	Minister for Works and Housing; Minister for Works; 1951–1956	Succeeded by Allen Fairhall
Preceded by John McDonald	Deputy Premier of Victoria; 1948–1949	Succeeded by Trevor Oldham
Parliament of Australia
New division	Member for Chisholm; 1949–1970	Succeeded by Tony Staley
Victorian Legislative Assembly
New district	Member for Kew; 1927–1949	Succeeded by Arthur Rylah
Sporting positions
Preceded by (Finland) Erik v. Frenckell	President of Organizing Committee for Summer Olympic Games; 1956	Succeeded by (Italy) Giulio Andreotti
