= 1943 Victorian state election =

← 1940	12 June 1943	1945 →

51 (of the 65) seats in the Victorian Legislative Assembly 33 seats needed for a majority
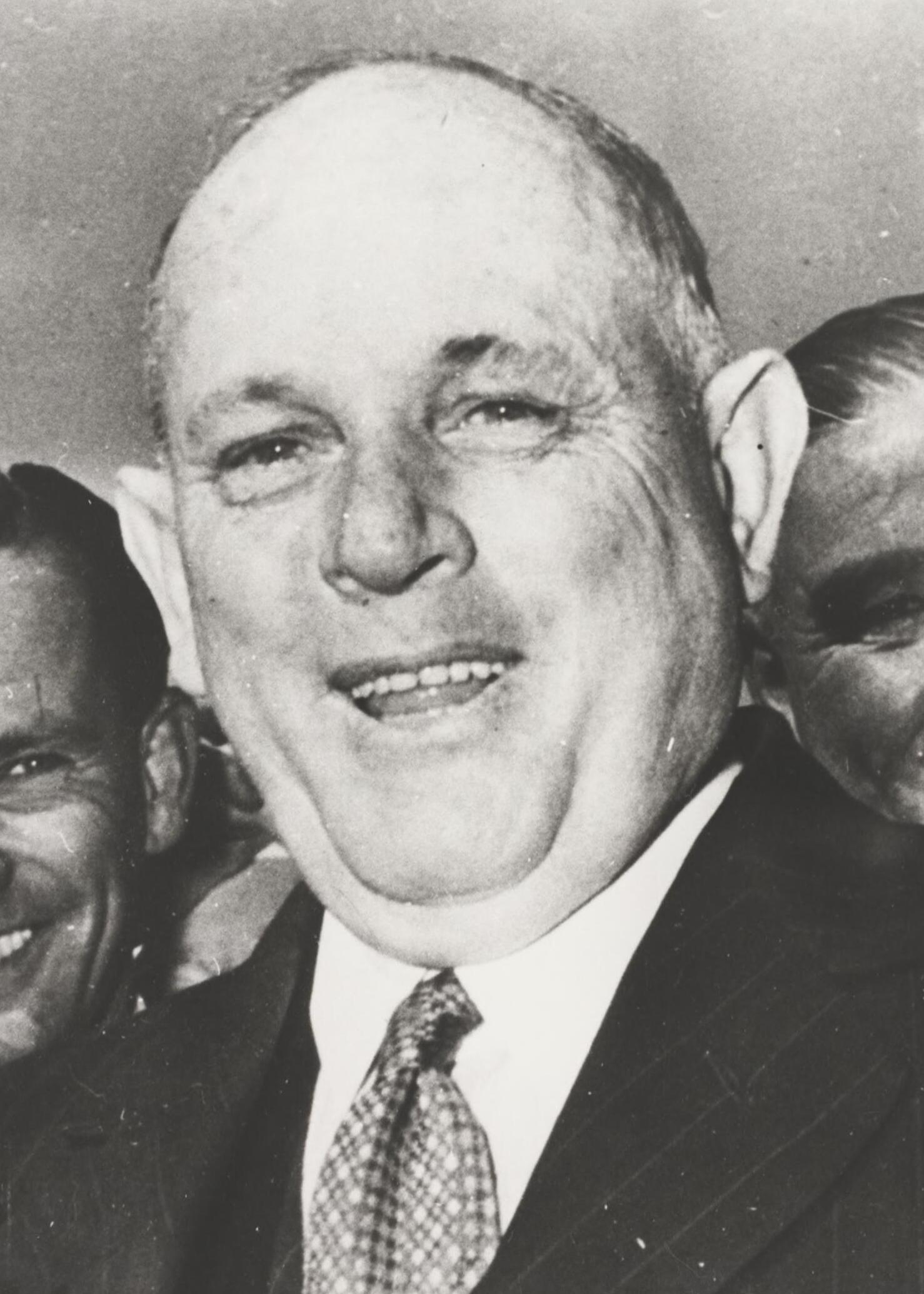

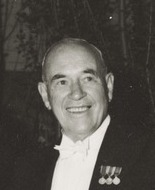

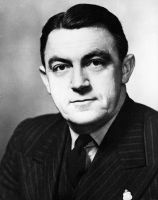
	First party	Second party	Third party
Leader	Albert Dunstan	John Cain	Thomas Hollway
Party	United Country	Labor	United Australia
Leader since	14 March 1935	18 October 1937	3 December 1940
Leader's seat	Korong and Eaglehawk	Northcote	Ballarat
Last election	22 seats	22 seats	16 seats
Seats won	25 seats	22 seats	13 seats
Seat change	▲3	0	▼3
Percentage	14.39%	36.13%	23.07%
Swing	▲0.23	▲2.96	▼12.34
Premier before election
Albert Dunstan
United Country
Elected Premier
Albert Dunstan
United Country

The 1943 Victorian state election was held in the Australian state of Victoria on Saturday 12 June 1943 to elect 65 members of the state's Legislative Assembly.

== Background ==
=== Country Party unity ===
At the time of the election, the Country Party was in the process of repairing a split which had taken place in December 1937 after federal MP John McEwen was expelled from the state branch of the party. The splinter group which supported McEwen had formed the Liberal Country Party on 30 March 1938, which contested the 1940 state election as a separate party. By April 1943, the United Country Party and the Liberal Country Party had formed a joint executive, which had unanimously agreed to reunite the parties. Members of the LCP at the time of the election were endorsed and counted as Victorian Country Party candidates separately from the United Country Party, but the unity agreements meant that their seats were counted for Dunstan's UCP.

== Results ==
=== Legislative Assembly ===
Victorian state election, 12 June 1943 Legislative Assembly << 1940–1945 >>
Enrolled voters	1,015,750				
Votes cast	883,679		Turnout	87.00	−6.41
Informal votes	22,876		Informal	2.59	+1.03
Summary of votes by party
Party	Primary votes	%	Swing	Seats	Change
Labor	311,051	36.13	+2.96	22	±0
United Australia	198,582	23.07	−12.34	13	−3
United Country	112,164	13.03	−1.13	18	−4
Communist	38,802	4.51	+4.13	0	±0
Victorian Country	11,738	1.36	−0.98	7	+6
Independent	188,466	21.89	+7.36	5	+1
Total	860,803			65	

Notes:

- Fourteen seats were uncontested at this election, and were retained by the incumbent parties:
  - Labor (7): Bendigo, Brunswick, Dundas, Flemington, Geelong, Northcote, Wonthaggi.
  - Victorian Country (6): Gippsland East, Goulburn Valley, Gunbower, Lowan, Mornington, Upper Goulburn
  - UAP (1): Kew

== See also ==
- Candidates of the 1943 Victorian state election
