= Winston Dugan, 1st Baron Dugan of Victoria =

British Army general (1876–1951)

Major-General The Right Honourable The Lord Dugan of Victoria GCMG CB DSO KStJ
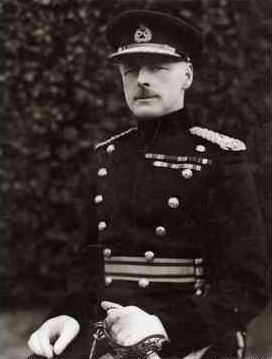
- Sir Winston Dugan as Governor of South Australia in 1934

21st Governor of South Australia
- In office 28 July 1934 – 23 February 1939
- Monarchs: George V (1934–36); Edward VIII (1936); George VI (1936–39)
- Premier: Richard Layton Butler (1934–38); Sir Thomas Playford (1938–39)
- Preceded by: The Earl of Gowrie
- Succeeded by: Sir Malcolm Barclay-Harvey

18th Governor of Victoria
- In office 17 July 1939 – 20 February 1949
- Monarch: George VI
- Preceded by: Lord Huntingfield
- Succeeded by: Sir Reginald Brooks

Personal details
- Born: Winston Joseph Dugan; 3 September 1876 Parsonstown, King's County, Ireland
- Died: 17 August 1951 (aged 74) Marylebone, London, England
- Spouse: Ruby Lilian Applewhaite-Abbott

Military service
- Allegiance: United Kingdom
- Branch/service: British Army
- Years of service: 1896–1934
- Rank: Major-General
- Unit: Royal Sussex Regiment; Royal Lincolnshire Regiment; Worcestershire Regiment
- Commands: 56th (1st London) Division (1931–34); 10th Brigade (1919–23); 73rd Brigade (1916–18); 184th (2nd South Midland) Brigade (1916)
- Battles/wars: Second Boer War; First World War
- Awards: Knight Grand Cross of the Order of St Michael and St George; Companion of the Order of the Bath; Distinguished Service Order; Knight of Justice of the Order of St John; Mentioned in Despatches (6)

Major-General Winston Joseph Dugan, 1st Baron Dugan of Victoria, GCMG, CB, DSO, KStJ (3 September 1876 – 17 August 1951), known as Sir Winston Dugan between 1934 and 1949, was a British administrator and a career British Army officer. He served as Governor of South Australia from 1934 to 1939, then Governor of Victoria until 1949.

== Background and education ==
Dugan was the son of Charles Winston Dugan, of Oxmantown Mall, Birr, County Offaly, Ireland, an inspector of schools. His mother was born Esther Elizabeth Rogers. He attended Lurgan College, Craigavon, Ireland from 1887 to 1889, and Wimbledon College, Wimbledon, London, England. The family name was pronounced as "Duggan". They were originally from County Galway and were a branch of the Soghain people.

== Military career ==
Dugan was a sergeant in the Royal Sussex Regiment, but transferred to the Lincolnshire Regiment as a second lieutenant on 24 January 1900. He left Southampton two months later with a detachment sent to reinforce the 2nd battalion of his regiment in the Second Boer War. While in South Africa, he was appointed adjutant of his battalion on 28 June 1901, and promoted to lieutenant on 1 November 1901. For his service in the war, he received the Queen's South Africa Medal with three clasps.

He later fought with distinction in the First World War, where he was wounded and mentioned in despatches six times. He was promoted in July 1916 to the temporary rank of brigadier general and commanded the 61st (2nd South Midland) Division's 184th (2nd South Midland) Brigade on the Western Front. He was awarded the Distinguished Service Order (DSO) in 1915 and appointed a Companion of the Order of St Michael and St George (CMG) in 1918.

He was promoted to brevet colonel in January 1919.

On 16 March 1928 he was appointed a personal aide-de-camp to King George V. On 3 June 1929 he was made a Companion of the Order of the Bath (CB) in the 1929 Birthday Honours and on 13 April 1930 was promoted to major general. From June 1931 to June 1934 he commanded the 56th (London) Infantry Division, Territorial Army (TA).

== Governor of South Australia ==
In 1934, Dugan was appointed Governor of South Australia. He was appointed a Knight Commander of the Order of St Michael and St George (KCMG), retired from the army and moved to Adelaide with his wife. They became an extremely popular and glamorous vice-regal couple. Sir Winston and Lady Dugan were both excellent public speakers, and travelled widely to bring problems to the attention of the ministers of the day. He gave moral and financial support to numerous good causes and needy individuals. Upon the expiration of his term, there was bipartisan parliamentary support for him to serve a second term, but he had already accepted an appointment to be Governor of Victoria.

== Governor of Victoria ==
Sir Winston and Lady Dugan arrived in Melbourne on 17 July 1939. They continued their active role in community affairs, promoting unemployment reduction and making the ballroom of Government House, Melbourne available for the Australian Red Cross.

Dugan had an active role stabilising state politics during the tumultuous 1940s. Upon the disintegration of Albert Dunstan's Country Party government in 1943, he installed the Labor leader John Cain as premier. Four days later, Dunstan formed a coalition with the United Australia Party. Following the collapse of that ministry in 1945, Dugan dissolved parliament and called a general election for November, which resulted in the balance of power being held by independents. Dugan commissioned Cain to form the ministry of a minority government.

Dugan's term as governor was extended five times. He was also the Administrator of the Commonwealth on two occasions: from 5 September 1944 to 30 January 1945, between the departure of the governor-general, Lord Gowrie, and the arrival of his successor, Prince Henry, Duke of Gloucester; and from 19 January to 11 March 1947, between the departure of the Duke of Gloucester and the appointment of his successor, William McKell. He returned to England in February 1949. On 7 July 1949 he was raised to the peerage as Baron Dugan of Victoria, of Lurgan in the County of Armagh.

== Personal life ==
Dugan married Ruby Lilian, daughter of Charles Abbott of Kilcaskan, County Cork, in 1912. There were no children from the marriage. He died at Marylebone, London, on 17 August 1951, aged 74. He was buried at All Saints Church, adjacent to the Applewhaite estate, in South Pickenham, Norfolk.

Military offices
Preceded by Hubert Isacke	GOC 56th (London) Infantry Division; 1931–1934	Succeeded by Percy Commings
Government offices
Preceded by Sir Alexander Hore-Ruthven	Governor of South Australia; 1934–1939	Succeeded by Sir Malcolm Barclay-Harvey
Preceded by Lord Huntingfield	Governor of Victoria; 1939–1949	Succeeded by Sir Dallas Brooks
Peerage of the United Kingdom
New creation	Baron Dugan of Victoria; 1949–1951	Extinct
