= John Cain (34th Premier of Victoria) =

Australian politician (1882–1957)

The Honourable John Cain
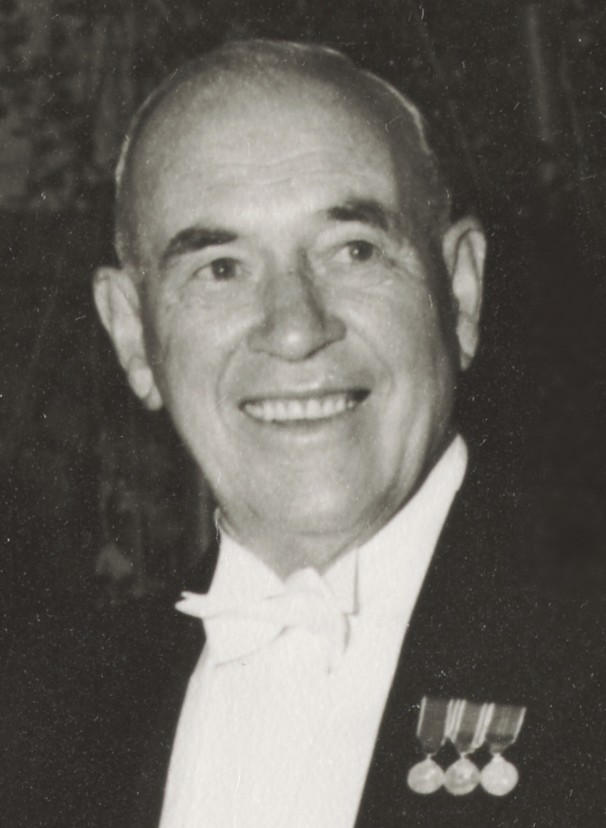
- Cain, 1954

34th Premier of Victoria
- In office 17 December 1952 – 7 June 1955
- Monarch: Elizabeth II
- Governor: Sir Dallas Brooks
- Deputy: Bill Galvin
- Preceded by: John McDonald
- Succeeded by: Henry Bolte
- In office 21 November 1945 – 20 November 1947
- Monarch: George VI
- Governor: Lord Dugan
- Deputy: Frank Field
- Preceded by: Ian Macfarlan
- Succeeded by: Thomas Hollway
- In office 14 September 1943 – 18 September 1943
- Monarch: George VI
- Governor: Lord Dugan
- Deputy: Bert Cremean
- Preceded by: Albert Dunstan
- Succeeded by: Albert Dunstan

Leader of the Opposition of Victoria
- In office 7 June 1955 – 4 August 1957
- Premier: Henry Bolte
- Deputy: Bill Galvin; Ernie Shepherd
- Preceded by: Henry Bolte
- Succeeded by: Ernie Shepherd
- In office 23 July 1952 – 17 December 1952
- Premier: John McDonald; Thomas Hollway; John McDonald
- Deputy: Bill Galvin
- Preceded by: Les Norman
- Succeeded by: Trevor Oldham
- In office 20 November 1947 – 7 December 1948
- Premier: Thomas Hollway
- Deputy: Frank Field; Bill Galvin
- Preceded by: John McDonald
- Succeeded by: John McDonald
- In office 18 September 1943 – 21 November 1945
- Premier: Albert Dunstan; Ian Macfarlan
- Deputy: Bert Cremean; Frank Field
- Preceded by: Albert Dunstan
- Succeeded by: John McDonald

Leader of the Labor Party in Victoria
- In office 19 October 1937 – 4 August 1957
- Deputy: Bert Cremean; Frank Field; Bill Galvin; Ernie Shepherd
- Preceded by: Tom Tunnecliffe
- Succeeded by: Ernie Shepherd

Member of the Victorian Legislative Assembly for Northcote
- In office 9 April 1927 – 4 August 1957
- Preceded by: Seat created
- Succeeded by: Frank Wilkes

Member of the Victorian Legislative Assembly for Jika Jika
- In office 15 November 1917 – 4 March 1927
- Preceded by: James Membrey
- Succeeded by: Seat abolished

Personal details
- Born: John Caine; 19 January 1882 Greendale, Victoria
- Died: 4 August 1957 (aged 75) Townsville, Queensland, Australia
- Party: Labor Party
- Spouse: Dorothea Vera Marie Grindrod (m. 1926)
- Children: 2, including John Cain
- Relatives: John Cain (grandson)
- Profession: Fruiterer, clerk and organiser

John Cain (19 January 1882 – 4 August 1957) was an Australian politician who served as the 34th premier of Victoria for four days in 1943, from 1945 to 1947, and again from 1952 to 1955 and leader of the Victorian Labor Party from 1937 to 1957. He was the member of the Legislative Assembly (MP) for the district of Jika Jika from 1917 to 1927, and that of Northcote from 1927 to 1957. Cain lead the Victorian Labor Party to its first parliamentary majority in the state’s history and remains the only premier whose son later served in the same office.

== Early life ==
Cain was born, oldest of 13 siblings, in Greendale, Victoria, near Bacchus Marsh. His father, Patrick Cane, was an Irish-born Roman Catholic who worked as a small farmer and contractor. His birth (number 3094 of 1882) was registered as John Caine, son of Patrick Caine and Julia Brannen at Greendale. His siblings were variously registered with the surnames Cane and Cain. (n.b. unusual misspelling of his mother's surname).

John Caine changed the spelling of his surname and converted to Anglicanism. He left no personal papers and very little is known about his youth (so little, indeed, that reference works published during his lifetime, and shortly after his death, continued to give the year of his birth as 1887). He had extremely limited formal schooling, and worked from an early age as a farm labourer in the Goulburn Valley. By 1907 he had moved to Melbourne, where he was employed as a fruiterer in the suburb of Northcote.

== Political career ==
Around 1910 Cain joined the Victorian Socialist Party (VSP), a Marxist party to the left of the Labor Party (although like most VSP members Cain was probably also an ALP member at the time). In 1915 he became an organiser with the Theatrical Employees' Union, and in 1916 he became a clerk in the Defence Department. He was sacked from this job because of his opposition to conscription for World War I, and became an organiser with the Clothing Trades Union. From 1915 to 1927 he was a Labor member of the Northcote City Council. In 1921 when many VSP members joined the new Communist Party of Australia, Cain broke his connections with the party and became a mainstream Labor politician.

In 1926 Cain married Dorothea Grindrod, with whom he had two children. His son John Cain was born in 1931, when he was already nearly 50. He sent his son to Northcote High School and later Scotch College, Melbourne, an unusual choice for a Labor politician at that time.

Cain was elected in 1917 to the Victorian Legislative Assembly as MLA for Jika Jika, which was renamed Northcote in 1927, a seat he held for 40 years. Victoria was Labor's weakest state, and there had never been a majority Labor state government. This was partly because of Labor's weakness in rural areas (dominated by the Country Party) and partly because of the strength of Deakinite liberalism among middle-class voters in Melbourne. Most notably the lack of a Labor majority government was however due to the high degree of rural malapportionment existing in the state's electoral system, strongly favouring the rural electorates to the disenfranchisement of inner-city electorates, where Labor's vote was centralised.

Cain was assistant minister for agriculture in the short-lived minority Labor government of George Prendergast in 1924, a minister without portfolio in the first minority Labor government of Edmond Hogan (1927–28), and minister for railways and for electrical undertakings in the second Hogan government (1929–32).

When Hogan's government collapsed during the Great Depression and Hogan himself was expelled from the Labor Party, Cain became party deputy leader under Tom Tunnecliffe. Cain succeeded Tunnecliffe as Labor Leader in 1937. Under both Tunnecliffe and Cain, Labor supported the minority Country Party government of Albert Dunstan from 1935 to 1943.

== Cain's three governments ==
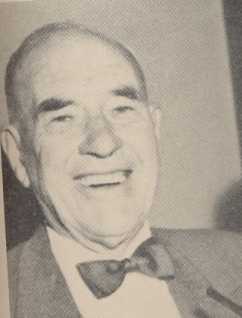
John Cain during the 1940s

=== First Cain government ===
In September 1943, Dunstan resigned, when his government lost a vote of no confidence in the Victorian Legislative Assembly, the Lower house of the Victorian Parliament. Cain became Premier and Labor formed a minority government on 14 September.

The first Cain government lasted only 4 days, from 14 to 18 September 1943. On 15 September, barely 24 hours after Governor of Victoria Sir Winston Dugan had sworn in the cabinet, the government was defeated in the Legislative Assembly. Cain's motion to adjourn the parliament for over a week was defeated by the Country Party and the United Australia Party (UAP), and Dunstan moved that Parliament resume the next day, giving notice that he would move a motion of no confidence against Cain's government, confident it would be carried by the CP–UAP alliance. Cain indicated that he would request a dissolution of parliament from the Governor, but if his request was refused, he would resign as Premier. On 17 September, Cain visited the Governor who refused his request for a dissolution, Cain then resigned and the Governor commissioned Dunstan to form a coalition government with the UAP, which was sworn in on Saturday 18 September.

=== Second Cain government ===
After Dunstan's resignation and a brief Liberal government under Ian Macfarlan, Cain again became premier on 21 November 1945. Labor's lower house parliamentary position was much better than it had been in 1943, since the 1945 state elections had given Labor 31 seats to the Country Party's 18 and the Liberals' 13, with three independents. With a majority in neither House, Cain's government was unable to pass much legislation. On 2 October 1947 the upper house, the Victorian Legislative Council blocked his government's budget to show its opposition to the federal Labor government of Ben Chifley, which had announced plans to nationalise the private banks. Although this issue had nothing to do with state politics, Cain was forced to resign and call an election for 8 November 1947, at which Labor was heavily defeated.

The 1950 election, however, gave Labor 24 seats to the Liberals' 27 and the Country Party's 13. Since the Liberals and Country Party hated each other, no stable majority government was possible, and this, together with the unpopularity of the new federal Liberal government, gave Cain his opportunity. In October 1952 the Country Party premier, John McDonald, resigned and called early elections. Labor won 37 seats, the first time it had won a majority in the lower house, and Cain formed his third government.

=== Third Cain government ===
Cain's government was hampered by the hostility of the Legislative Council (which until 1950 had been elected on a restricted property-based franchise and so always had a conservative majority), and also by tensions within his own party. During the war the Communist Party had grown greatly in strength in the trade unions which controlled and funded the Labor Party, leading a faction of anti-Communist Catholics to form within the party to fight Communist influence. (This body, known as The Movement, was organised by B. A. Santamaria and supported by the Catholic Archbishop of Melbourne, Daniel Mannix). Conflict between left and right in the Labor Party grew increasingly bitter in the Cold War atmosphere of the 1950s.

Nevertheless, the Cain government was able to pass more legislation than any previous Labor government in Victoria had done. Major reforms were carried out in the areas of workers' compensation, tenancy law, long service leave, hospitals, public transport, housing, charities and the Crimes Act. Changes included the provision on long-service leave to railway workers, increased eligibility to workers' compensation, alterations to the Shops and Factories Act and the Landlord and Tenant Act, and the introduction of legislation "to penalise rogues who resorted to fraudulent misrepresentation in soliciting corporate investment from the public."

The government had also reformed wage determination procedures and public service administration, while constructive initiatives were carried out in adult education and soil conservation. Even some reforms to the electoral system were carried through the council, where Labor and Liberal members united to reduce the malapportionment which had given the Country Party disproportionate representation since the 1920s. In its first two years the Cain government won the approval of the Melbourne daily papers The Age, The Herald and The Argus. Nevertheless, Cain's third Government fell on 19 April 1955 when 19 expelled Labor lower house members aligned to "The Movement" "crossed the floor" against the government in a vote of no confidence, ironically the same procedure that initiated Cain's first government.

== Cain and the Labor split ==
The Australian Labor Party split of 1955 started in October 1954 after the federal leader, Dr H. V. Evatt, blamed B. A. Santamaria and his supporters in the Victorian Labor Party for Labor's loss of seats at the 1954 federal election. Santamaria exercised strong influence in the Cain government through "Movement" linked ministers such as Bill Barry and Frank Scully. Protestant and left-wing ministers strongly opposed the Movement faction. In December 1953 the Lands Minister, Robert Holt, resigned rather than introduce a Santamaria-influenced bill which would have promoted the settlement of Italian immigrants as small farmers in Gippsland (a favourite Santamaria scheme which was seen as a plot to create a Catholic peasantry).

In early 1955 the Labor Party's federal executive dissolved the state executive and began to expel Santamaria's supporters from the party. The Victorian branch of the Labor Party then split between pro-Evatt and pro-Santamaria factions, and in March the pro-Evatt State Executive of the party suspended the membership of 24 members of State Parliament suspected of being Santamaria supporters. Four ministers were forced to resign from the government.

When the Parliament met on 19 April 1955, 19 expelled Labor members crossed over to vote with the Liberal and Country Party members to defeat the government. At the ensuing May 1955 election, the expelled members and others stood as the Australian Labor Party (Anti-Communist). Labor was heavily defeated, winning only 20 seats to the Liberals' 34 and the Country Party's ten. Only one of the expelled Labor members was re-elected.

Cain was now 73, although he remained outwardly vigorous and his real age was a well-kept secret. He retained the leadership and declared that he would fight the next election against the Liberal premier, Henry Bolte. In 1957, however, the ALP split spread to Queensland, and Cain went to campaign for Labor at the state election which followed the fall of the Queensland Labor government. In Townsville on 9 August he suffered a stroke and died within a few hours, aged 75. Alfred Ernest "Ernie" Shepherd (1901–58) succeeded Cain as ALP leader, only to die himself little more than a year afterwards. Labor remained in opposition in Victoria until the 1982 election, when Cain's son, John Cain Jr., led the party back to government.^{1}

== See also ==
- Political families of Australia

== Notes ==
^{1} John Cain (1882–1957) was the father of John Cain (41st Premier of Victoria) (1931–2019), who also has a son named John Cain who in 2019 became State Coroner of Victoria.

Victorian Legislative Assembly
Preceded by James Membrey	Member for Jika Jika; 1917–1927	District abolished
District created	Member for Northcote; 1927–1957	Succeeded by Frank Wilkes
Political offices
Preceded by Albert Dunstan	Premier of Victoria; 1943	Succeeded by Albert Dunstan
Preceded by Ian Macfarlan	Premier of Victoria; 1945–1947	Succeeded by Thomas Hollway
Preceded by John McDonald	Premier of Victoria; 1952–1955	Succeeded by Henry Bolte
Party political offices
Preceded by Tom Tunnecliffe	Leader of the Labor Party in Victoria; 1937–1957	Succeeded by Ernie Shepherd
