= Thomas Hollway =

Australian politician (1906–1971)

The Honourable Tom Hollway
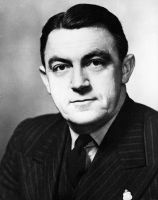
- Hollway, c. 1940s

36th Premier of Victoria
- In office 20 November 1947 – 27 June 1950
- Governor: Sir Winston Dugan (1947–1949); Sir Dallas Brooks (1949–1950)
- Deputy: John McDonald (1947–1948); Wilfrid Hughes (1948–1950)
- Preceded by: John Cain Sr.
- Succeeded by: John McDonald
- In office 28 October 1952 – 31 October 1952
- Governor: Sir Dallas Brooks
- Deputy: Alexander Dennett
- Preceded by: John McDonald
- Succeeded by: John McDonald

9th Deputy Premier of Victoria
- In office 18 September 1943 – 2 October 1945
- Premier: Albert Dunstan
- Preceded by: Bert Cremean
- Succeeded by: Thomas Maltby

Member of the Victorian Legislative Assembly for Ballarat
- In office 14 May 1932 – 31 October 1952
- Preceded by: William McAdam
- Succeeded by: John Sheehan

Member of the Victorian Legislative Assembly for Glen Iris
- In office 6 December 1952 – 22 April 1955
- Preceded by: Les Norman
- Succeeded by: District abolished

Personal details
- Born: Thomas Tuke Hollway; 2 October 1906 Ballarat, Victoria, Australia
- Died: 30 July 1971 (aged 64) Point Lonsdale, Victoria, Australia
- Party: United Australia Party (until 1945); Liberal Party (1945–1949); Liberal and Country Party (1949–1952); Electoral Reform League (1952–1954); Victorian Liberal Party (1954–1955)
- Spouse: Sheila Florence Kelsall
- Education: University of Melbourne
- Profession: Solicitor

Military service
- Allegiance: Australia
- Branch/service: Royal Australian Air Force
- Years of service: 1942–1943
- Rank: Flying Officer
- Unit: No. 100 Squadron RAAF

Thomas Tuke Hollway (2 October 1906 – 30 July 1971) was the 36th Premier of Victoria, and the first to be born in the 20th century. He held office from 1947 to 1950, and again for a short period in 1952. He was originally a member and the leader of the United Australia Party (UAP) in Victoria, and was the inaugural leader of the UAP's successor, the Victorian division of the Liberal Party, but split from the Liberals after a dispute over electoral reform issues.

== Early life ==
Thomas Tuke Hollway was born in Ballarat, the son of local merchant of the same name who would go on to become mayor of Ballarat, and Annie Nicholl. He was educated locally, at the Macarthur Street School and Ballarat Church of England Grammar School. He studied arts and law at the University of Melbourne's Trinity College, and was admitted to practice as a solicitor in 1928, joining the Ballarat firm R. J. Gribble.

== Political career ==
=== Early career ===
Hollway was elected to the Victorian Legislative Assembly at the 1932 Victorian state election, representing the seat of Ballarat. At the time of his election, aged 25, he was the youngest member of any Australian parliament.

In 1940, he was made UAP party secretary and whip, and in the same year deputy leader of the UAP. On 23 November 1940, UAP leader Sir Stanley Argyle died, and Hollway was elected party leader on 3 December. In February 1942, whilst retaining his seat in parliament and the party leadership, Hollway enlisted in the Royal Australian Air Force. He trained as an intelligence officer and served as a Flying Officer in Papua, before being discharged and transferred to the reserves in July 1943.

In Albert Dunstan's second wartime government (1943–1945) Hollway was Deputy Premier of Victoria.

The UAP was brought under the Liberal Party of Australia banner in 1945 and Hollway became the inaugural leader of its Victorian division.

=== Premier of Victoria ===
At the 1947 state election held on 8 November, Hollway led a Liberal–Country coalition to defeat the incumbent Labor administration of John Cain Sr. Hollway became Premier—at 41, he was among the youngest Premiers Victoria has ever had.

However, the coalition supporting him was not strong. In March 1949, the Victorian division of the Liberal Party renamed itself the Liberal and Country Party in an attempt to absorb the Country Party's supporters. In September six members of the Country Party defected to the LCP, further deepening the rift between the allies.

The Country Party's leader John McDonald was Hollway's initial Deputy Premier, however he was sacked as deputy in December 1948 after criticising Hollway's negotiations with the Trades Hall Council over transport strikes.

The coalition between the Liberals and Country Party was dissolved.

Hollway led the Liberal Party to victory in the 13 May 1950 state election, gaining the most seats of any party, and having supply support from the Country Party. However this minority government arrangement was not to last for long.

Hollway lost office on 27 June 1950, when he was overthrown by the Country Party under McDonald. This occurred when the Labor Party agreed to support a minority Country Party government. Hollway advised the Governor of Victoria, Sir Dallas Brooks to dissolve parliament again citing what he called "a great electoral fraud", but Brooks refused, and appointed McDonald to form a government.

=== Electoral reform plan and party expulsion ===
During his period as opposition leader, Hollway became a firm advocate of electoral reform. He considered Victoria's electoral system to be heavily rurally-biased, and suggested redrawing the state's electoral boundaries to emulate Tasmania's, that is, to follow the federal electoral divisions which were less malapportioned. His proposal was called the "two-for-one system", where each of Victoria's 33 federal electorates would be divided into two for the purposes of the state's lower house elections. The Hollway Plan, if implemented, would have seriously reduced the representation of the Country Party, and as such was supported by the Labor party as well as several on the Liberal side. Hollway convinced the state executive of the Liberal and Country Party to endorse his reform proposals, however there was considerable dissent in the party, particularly from members who feared losing their seats in the redistribution.

Hollway attempted to contain the divisions in his party, but on 4 December 1951, the party moved against him and his deputy Trevor Oldham, overthrowing their leadership and replacing them with Les Norman and Henry Bolte. The vote was close (21 to 19), and three members who were likely to have supported Hollway in the ballot were absent.

Hollway continued to advocate for electoral reform, and worked closely with the Labor Party to attempt to achieve it. He dismissed criticism of his negotiations with Labor with the assertion that his plan was for the good of the community, and transcended party politics. On 17 September 1952, Hollway moved a motion of no confidence against McDonald's government, which was defeated by a one-vote majority. The Liberals quickly moved to expel Hollway from the parliamentary party on 24 September, Norman stating that he had deliberately discredited the party while it was contesting two key by-elections. The expulsion motion carried 23 to 9, with seven members walking out of the party meeting in solidarity with Hollway.

=== Bribery accusations and Royal Commission ===
On 30 September 1952, LCP leader Les Norman told the Legislative Assembly that he was in possession of six affidavits testifying that a representative of Hollway had offered financial and political incentives to various members of the assembly in return for their support in his no-confidence motion against McDonald's government. The accusers included the Speaker, Sir Archie Michaelis, who said that he had been offered the post of Agent-General and immunity from opposition at the next state election.

Norman requested that McDonald immediately establish a Royal Commission to investigate the charges, although John Cain and the Labor Party made an unsuccessful bid to have a parliamentary select committee review the allegations. McDonald declared "The nature of the allegations is so serious and sinister that only the most effective and searching investigation should be considered by the House.", and announced that a Royal Commission (consisting of the Chief Justice Sir Edmund Herring, Justice Gavan Duffy and Justice Russell Martin) would be set up.

On 27 October 1952, Sir Edmund Herring adjourned the royal commission indefinitely, due to a legal technicality raised by Hollway's counsel, Eugene Gorman: Hollway had raised a writ for libel against The Age newspaper for claims made while reporting on the bribery allegations. Under the sub judice rule, as the matters under review by the commission were part of an ongoing court case, discussion of such matters could be deemed a contempt of court. Hollway later settled with The Age out of court, and the Royal Commission was never reconvened.

=== The 70-hour Premier and the Electoral Reform League ===
In October 1952, the Labor Party moved to defeat the McDonald government by working with two of Hollway's supporters in the Victorian Legislative Council to block supply in the upper house. Labor then informed the Governor that they would only grant supply to a minority government led by Hollway, and McDonald resigned as Premier.

On 23 October, Governor Brooks granted Hollway a commission to form a minority government with the seven former LCP members who supported him, with the backing of the Labor Party on confidence and supply. The Hollway ministry, consisting of seven of his supporters, was sworn in at noon on 28 October. Hollway's ministry was to be the most short-lived in Victorian history, surviving only four days (or seventy hours). On 31 October, Hollway requested a dissolution of parliament from the Governor. Brooks not only refused the request, but forced Hollway to resign and recommissioned McDonald as Premier. In addition, an election was called for 6 December. On the same day, Hollway and his supporters formalised their grouping, forming the Electoral Reform League to run as a party in the December election.

=== 1952 and 1955 elections ===
The Electoral Reform League contested fifteen seats at the 1952 state election. In addition, Hollway announced that he would not contest Ballarat at the election, but would instead run for the seat of Glen Iris—the seat occupied by Les Norman, leader of his former party. Hollway was not expected to win against Norman, but then led the polling from the start of counting, defeating Norman easily. Cain's Labor Party won the election with the largest majority in its history, and the ERL won four seats (down from six).

The Cain government proceeded to implement Hollway's "two-for-one" electoral redistribution plan. Ironically, Hollway's seat of Glen Iris was one of the electorates abolished in the redistribution. With his electoral reform plans implemented, Hollway changed the name of his party grouping to the Victorian Liberal Party in October 1954. In the 1955 election, Hollway stood as a candidate for Ripponlea, but had lost his enthusiasm for campaigning as his electoral ideals had been fulfilled, and he was defeated by Edgar Tanner, the LCP candidate.

== Later life ==
After his defeat, Hollway retired to Point Lonsdale where he was active in the local community. In later life he suffered from cirrhosis of the liver and died of a cerebral haemorrhage on 30 July 1971, 64 days short of his 65th birthday.

Victorian Legislative Assembly
Preceded by William McAdam	Member for Ballarat; 1932–1952	Succeeded by John Sheehan
Preceded by Les Norman	Member for Glen Iris; 1952–1955	Seat abolished
Political offices
Preceded by Herbert Cremean	Deputy Premier of Victoria; 1943–1945	Succeeded by Thomas Maltby
Preceded by John Cain	Premier of Victoria; 1947–1950	Succeeded by John McDonald
Preceded by John McDonald	Premier of Victoria; 1952	Succeeded by John McDonald
Party political offices
Preceded by Sir Stanley Argyle	Leader of the United Australia Party in Victoria; 1943–1945	Party became the Liberal Party
New party	Leader of the Liberal Party in Victoria; 1945–1951	Succeeded by Les Norman
