= Electoral results for the district of Gippsland East =

Victoria, Australia, district election results

This is a list of electoral results for the Electoral district of Gippsland East in Victorian state elections.

== Members for Gippsland East ==
Member	Party	Term
Henry Foster	Unaligned	1889–1902
James Cameron	Ministerialist	1902–1920
James Cameron	Commonwealth Liberal	1902–1920
James Cameron	Nationalist	1902–1920
Sir Albert Lind	Farmers Union	1920–1961
Sir Albert Lind	Country	1920–1961
Bruce Evans	Country	1961–1975
Bruce Evans	National Country	1975–1982
Bruce Evans	National	1982–1992
David Treasure	National	1992–1999
Craig Ingram	Independent	1999–2010
Tim Bull	National	2010–present

== Election results ==
=== Elections in the 2020s ===
2022 Victorian state election: Gippsland East
Party	Candidate	Votes	%	±%
National	Tim Bull	26,737	63.3	+6.6
Labor	Stephen Richardson	7,191	17.0	−4.7
Greens	Nissa Ling	2,691	6.4	+0.2
Shooters, Fishers, Farmers	Ricky Muir	2,460	5.8	+5.8
Freedom	Ed Barnes	1,340	3.2	+3.2
Family First	Carl John Fechner	1,068	2.5	+2.5
Animal Justice	Sally Court	725	1.7	+1.7
Total formal votes		42,209	95.5	+1.2
Informal votes		1,995	4.5	−1.2
Turnout		44,204	89.0	+1.3
Two-party-preferred result
National	Tim Bull	31,475	74.6	+7.0
Labor	Stephen Richardson	10,734	25.4	−7.0
National hold		Swing	+7.0	

=== Elections in the 2010s ===
2018 Victorian state election: Gippsland East
Party	Candidate	Votes	%	±%
National	Tim Bull	22,438	56.7	−3.7
Labor	Mark Reeves	8,589	21.7	+1.3
Liberal Democrats	Sonia Buckley	2,507	6.3	+6.3
Greens	Deb Foskey	2,455	6.2	−1.8
Independent	Matt Stephenson	1,509	3.8	+3.8
Independent	George Neophytou	1,210	3.1	+3.1
Independent	Benjamin Garrett	842	2.1	+2.1
Total formal votes		39,550	94.2	−0.2
Informal votes		2,411	5.8	+0.2
Turnout		41,961	90.6	
Two-party-preferred result
National	Tim Bull	26,819	67.6	−0.3
Labor	Mark Reeves	12,859	32.4	+0.3
National hold		Swing	−0.3	

2014 Victorian state election: Gippsland East
Party	Candidate	Votes	%	±%
National	Tim Bull	22,984	60.4	+15.2
Labor	Kate Maxfield	7,754	20.4	+12.9
Greens	Scott Campbell-Smith	3,035	8.0	+2.7
Country Alliance	David Hutchison	1,436	3.8	+1.2
Independent	Leigh McDonald	929	2.4	+2.4
Independent	Peter Gardner	763	2.0	+2.0
Independent	Peter McKenzie	644	1.7	+1.7
Rise Up Australia	Jenny Jack	531	1.4	+1.4
Total formal votes		38,076	94.4	−2.4
Informal votes		2,270	5.6	+2.4
Turnout		40,346	93.6	+1.0
Two-party-preferred result
National	Tim Bull	25,954	67.9	−5.2
Labor	Kate Maxfield	12,263	32.1	+5.2
National hold		Swing	−5.2	

2010 Victorian state election: Gippsland East
Party	Candidate	Votes	%	±%
National	Tim Bull	16,987	45.12	+26.32
Independent	Craig Ingram	9,528	25.31	−13.11
Liberal	Sonia Buckley	5,368	14.26	−7.53
Labor	Gregg Cook	2,821	7.49	−4.16
Greens	Jill Redwood	1,976	5.25	+0.33
Country Alliance	Deborah Meester	972	2.58	+2.58
Total formal votes		37,652	96.81	+0.94
Informal votes		1,242	3.19	−0.94
Turnout		38,894	93.91	+1.09
Two-party-preferred result
National	Tim Bull	27,529	73.1	+9.6
Labor	Gregg Cook	10,123	26.9	−9.6
Two-candidate-preferred result
National	Tim Bull	23,403	62.06	+20.53
Independent	Craig Ingram	14,305	37.94	−20.53
National gain from Independent		Swing	+20.53	

=== Elections in the 2000s ===
2006 Victorian state election: Gippsland East
Party	Candidate	Votes	%	±%
Independent	Craig Ingram	13,344	38.4	−2.9
Liberal	Peter Bommer	7,566	21.8	+9.1
National	Chris Nixon	6,530	18.8	−5.1
Labor	Zach Smith	4,047	11.7	−3.1
Greens	Geoffrey De Jonge	1,709	4.9	+0.3
Family First	Dean Beveridge	1,137	3.3	+3.3
Independent	Clint Eastwood	395	1.1	+1.1
Total formal votes		34,728	95.9	−0.2
Informal votes		1,496	4.1	+0.2
Turnout		36,224	92.8	−0.7
Two-party-preferred result
Liberal	Peter Bommer	22,064	63.5	+3.4
Labor	Zach Smith	12,662	36.5	−3.4
Two-candidate-preferred result
Independent	Craig Ingram	20,526	59.1	−2.6
Liberal	Peter Bommer	14,202	40.9	+40.9
Independent hold		Swing	−2.6	

2002 Victorian state election: Gippsland East
Party	Candidate	Votes	%	±%
Independent	Craig Ingram	13,919	41.3	+18.9
National	Darren Chester	8,061	23.9	−13.0
Labor	Terry Grange	4,997	14.8	−13.0
Liberal	Leigh Dent	4,273	12.7	+12.7
Greens	Kevin Thiele	1,536	4.6	+4.6
Independent	Jacqueline McKeown	447	1.3	+1.3
Independent	Ben Buckley	444	1.3	−3.8
Total formal votes		33,677	96.1	−1.2
Informal votes		1,365	3.9	+1.2
Turnout		35,042	93.5	
Two-party-preferred result
National	Darren Chester	20,204	60.2	+7.4
Labor	Terry Grange	13,371	39.8	−7.4
Two-candidate-preferred result
Independent	Craig Ingram	20,791	61.7	+4.2
National	Darren Chester	12,886	38.3	−4.2
Independent hold		Swing	+4.2	

=== Elections in the 1990s ===
1999 Victorian state election: Gippsland East
Party	Candidate	Votes	%	±%
National	David Treasure	10,776	35.9	−16.9
Labor	Bill Bolitho	8,177	27.3	−1.3
Independent	Craig Ingram	7,439	24.8	+24.8
One Nation	Michael Freshwater	1,911	6.4	+6.4
Independent	Ben Buckley	1,704	5.7	+5.7
Total formal votes		30,007	97.4	−0.9
Informal votes		812	2.6	+0.9
Turnout		30,819	93.2	
Two-party-preferred result
National	David Treasure	15,782	52.6	−12.6
Labor	Bill Bolitho	14,222	47.4	+12.6
Two-candidate-preferred result
Independent	Craig Ingram	17,317	57.7	+57.7
National	David Treasure	12,690	42.3	−22.9
Independent gain from National		Swing	+57.7	

1996 Victorian state election: Gippsland East
Party	Candidate	Votes	%	±%
National	David Treasure	15,999	52.9	−3.6
Labor	Lynne Roder	8,636	28.5	+8.1
Independent	Bruce Ellett	5,226	17.3	+6.5
Natural Law	Bruce Lusher	408	1.3	+1.3
Total formal votes		30,269	98.3	+0.5
Informal votes		530	1.7	−0.5
Turnout		30,799	94.1	
Two-party-preferred result
National	David Treasure	19,672	65.2	−8.2
Labor	Lynne Roder	10,494	34.8	+8.2
National hold		Swing	−8.2	

1992 Victorian state election: Gippsland East
Party	Candidate	Votes	%	±%
National	David Treasure	16,225	56.5	+8.9
Labor	John Halloran	5,869	20.4	−9.1
Independent	Bruce Ellett	3,099	10.8	+10.8
Independent	Roger Steedman	1,732	6.0	+6.0
Independent	Ian Honey	1,274	4.4	+4.4
Independent	Bob Lansbury	526	1.8	+1.8
Total formal votes		28,725	97.8	−0.1
Informal votes		659	2.2	+0.1
Turnout		29,384	95.1	
Two-party-preferred result
National	David Treasure	21,053	73.4	+4.2
Labor	John Halloran	7,639	26.6	−4.2
National hold		Swing	+4.2	

=== Elections in the 1980s ===
1988 Victorian state election: Gippsland East
Party	Candidate	Votes	%	±%
National	Bruce Evans	13,218	46.99	−2.63
Labor	Jan Devink	8,232	29.26	−1.40
Liberal	William Young	6,162	21.91	+2.19
Call to Australia	Robert Watson	518	1.84	+1.84
Total formal votes		28,130	97.91	−0.57
Informal votes		601	2.09	+0.57
Turnout		28,713	92.44	−0.27
Two-party-preferred result
National	Bruce Evans	19,384	69.42	+1.90
Labor	Jan Devink	8,538	30.58	−1.90
National hold		Swing	+1.90	

1985 Victorian state election: Gippsland East
Party	Candidate	Votes	%	±%
National	Bruce Evans	13,078	49.6	+5.5
Labor	Clifford Harding	8,081	30.7	−1.7
Liberal	David McInnes	5,196	19.7	+0.4
Total formal votes		26,355	98.5	
Informal votes		406	1.5	
Turnout		26,761	92.7	
Two-party-preferred result
National	Bruce Evans	17,794	67.5	+3.3
Labor	Clifford Harding	8,561	32.5	−3.3
National hold		Swing	+3.3	

1982 Victorian state election: Gippsland East
Party	Candidate	Votes	%	±%
National	Bruce Evans	11,202	43.6	+2.3
Labor	Dan Luscombe	8,370	32.6	+1.4
Liberal	John Riggall	5,029	19.6	−7.9
Democrats	Ian Glover	1,069	4.2	+4.2
Total formal votes		25,670	97.7	+1.1
Informal votes		612	2.3	−1.1
Turnout		26,282	92.9	+0.2
Two-party-preferred result
National	Bruce Evans	16,446	64.1	−3.2
Labor	Dan Luscombe	9,224	35.9	+3.2
National hold		Swing	−3.2	

=== Elections in the 1970s ===
1979 Victorian state election: Gippsland East
Party	Candidate	Votes	%	±%
National	Bruce Evans	9,807	41.3	−4.6
Labor	Graeme McIntyre	7,421	31.2	+31.2
Liberal	Philip Davis	6,549	27.5	+6.0
Total formal votes		23,777	96.6	−1.2
Informal votes		844	3.4	+1.2
Turnout		24,621	92.7	+0.3
Two-party-preferred result
National	Bruce Evans	16,005	67.3	−3.4
Labor	Graeme McIntyre	7,919	32.9	+32.9
National hold		Swing	−3.4	

1976 Victorian state election: Gippsland East
Party	Candidate	Votes	%	±%
National	Bruce Evans	10,484	45.9	+7.1
Independent	Geoffrey Cox	6,419	28.1	+28.1
Liberal	Geoffrey Ramsden	4,899	21.4	−2.9
Democratic Labor	Robert McMahon	1,038	4.5	−1.5
Total formal votes		22,840	97.8	
Informal votes		505	2.2	
Turnout		23,345	92.4	
Two-candidate-preferred result
National	Bruce Evans	16,146	70.7	+3.3
Independent	Geoffrey Cox	6,694	29.3	+29.3
National hold		Swing	N/A	

1973 Victorian state election: Gippsland East
Party	Candidate	Votes	%	±%
Country	Bruce Evans	7,821	40.5	+3.6
Labor	Geoffrey Cox	6,002	31.1	+5.1
Liberal	John Sheehan	4,285	22.2	−2.3
Democratic Labor	Robert McMahon	1,201	6.2	−6.3
Total formal votes		19,309	97.8	+0.5
Informal votes		442	2.2	−0.5
Turnout		19,751	93.9	−0.5
Two-party-preferred result
Country	Bruce Evans	12,994	67.3	−3.5
Labor	Geoffrey Cox	6,315	32.7	+3.5
Country hold		Swing	−3.5	

1970 Victorian state election: Gippsland East
Party	Candidate	Votes	%	±%
Country	Bruce Evans	6,570	36.9	−13.2
Labor	Philip Grech	4,628	26.0	+4.5
Liberal	Keith Mason	4,367	24.5	+9.4
Democratic Labor	Frank Burns	2,226	12.5	−0.7
Total formal votes		17,791	97.3	−0.3
Informal votes		498	2.7	+0.3
Turnout		18,289	94.4	+0.3
Two-party-preferred result
Country	Bruce Evans	12,601	70.8	−4.2
Labor	Philip Grech	5,190	29.2	+4.2
Two-candidate-preferred result
Country	Bruce Evans	11,579	65.1	−9.9
Liberal	Keith Mason	6,212	34.9	+9.9
Country hold		Swing	−9.9	

=== Elections in the 1960s ===
1967 Victorian state election: Gippsland East
Party	Candidate	Votes	%	±%
Country	Bruce Evans	8,605	50.2	−13.4
Labor	Thomas Powell	3,683	21.5	+21.5
Liberal	D.P. Palmer	2,596	15.1	−6.4
Democratic Labor	Frank Burns	2,273	13.2	−1.7
Total formal votes		17,157	97.6	
Informal votes		423	2.4	
Turnout		17,580	94.1	
Two-party-preferred result
Country	Bruce Evans	12,874	75.0	+8.4
Labor	Thomas Powell	4,283	25.0	+25.0
Country hold		Swing	+8.4	

1964 Victorian state election: Gippsland East
Party	Candidate	Votes	%	±%
Country	Bruce Evans	12,729	63.9	+26.6
Liberal and Country	Rae Archibald	4,289	21.5	−2.6
Democratic Labor	Frank Burns	2,885	14.5	−0.2
Total formal votes		19,903	97.8	0.0
Informal votes		453	2.2	0.0
Turnout		20,356	93.1	−0.5
Two-candidate-preferred result
Country	Bruce Evans	13,306	66.9	+4.6
Liberal and Country	Rae Archibald	6,597	33.1	−4.6
Country hold		Swing	+4.6	

1961 Victorian state election: Gippsland East
Party	Candidate	Votes	%	±%
Country	Bruce Evans	7,342	37.3	−20.9
Liberal and Country	Rae Archibald	4,752	24.1	+1.1
Labor	Neil Rosser	4,715	23.9	+23.9
Democratic Labor	Frank Burns	2,901	14.7	−4.1
Total formal votes		19,710	97.8	−0.7
Informal votes		441	2.2	+0.7
Turnout		20,151	93.6	−0.9
Two-party-preferred result
Country	Bruce Evans	14,085	71.5	−0.8
Labor	Neil Rosser	5,625	28.5	+28.5
Two-candidate-preferred result
Country	Bruce Evans	12,273	62.3	−10.0
Liberal and Country	Rae Archibald	7,437	37.7	+10.0
Country hold		Swing	−10.0	

=== Elections in the 1950s ===
1958 Victorian state election: Gippsland East
Party	Candidate	Votes	%	±%
Country	Albert Lind	11,285	58.2	
Liberal and Country	Rae Archibald	4,465	23.0	
Democratic Labor	Frank Burns	3,650	18.8	
Total formal votes		19,400	98.5	
Informal votes		304	1.5	
Turnout		19,704	94.5	
Two-candidate-preferred result
Country	Albert Lind	13,110	67.6	
Liberal and Country	Rae Archibald	6,290	32.4	
Country hold		Swing		

1955 Victorian state election: Gippsland East
Party	Candidate	Votes	%	±%
Country	Albert Lind	13,084	75.2	
Labor (A-C)	Frank Burns	4,323	24.8	
Total formal votes		17,407	98.3	
Informal votes		308	1.7	
Turnout		17,715	92.5	
Country hold		Swing		

1952 Victorian state election: Gippsland East
Party	Candidate	Votes	%	±%
Country	Albert Lind	unopposed		
Country hold		Swing		

1950 Victorian state election: Gippsland East
Party	Candidate	Votes	%	±%
Country	Albert Lind	8,421	69.5	−2.0
Liberal and Country	Gordon Savage	3,691	30.5	+30.5
Total formal votes		12,112	98.1	−1.2
Informal votes		237	1.9	+1.2
Turnout		12,349	93.9	+0.3
Country hold		Swing	N/A	

=== Elections in the 1940s ===
1947 Victorian state election: Gippsland East
Party	Candidate	Votes	%	±%
Country	Albert Lind	8,376	71.5	+6.3
Labor	Thomas Parkinson	3,333	28.5	−6.3
Total formal votes		11,789	99.3	+0.1
Informal votes		77	0.7	−0.1
Turnout		11,786	93.6	+5.9
Country hold		Swing	+6.3	

1945 Victorian state election: Gippsland East
Party	Candidate	Votes	%	±%
Country	Albert Lind	6,812	65.2	
Labor	Reuben Basham	3,638	34.8	
Total formal votes		10,450	99.2	
Informal votes		87	0.8	
Turnout		10,537	87.7	
Country hold		Swing		

1943 Victorian state election: Gippsland East
Party	Candidate	Votes	%	±%
Country	Albert Lind	unopposed		
Country hold		Swing		

1940 Victorian state election: Gippsland East
Party	Candidate	Votes	%	±%
Country	Albert Lind	unopposed		
Country hold		Swing		

=== Elections in the 1930s ===
1937 Victorian state election: Gippsland East
Party	Candidate	Votes	%	±%
Country	Albert Lind	unopposed		
Country hold		Swing		

1935 Victorian state election: Gippsland East
Party	Candidate	Votes	%	±%
Country	Albert Lind	5,494	73.6	−26.4
Labor	Arnold Holst	1,968	26.4	+26.4
Total formal votes		7,462	99.3	
Informal votes		50	0.7	
Turnout		7,512	93.9	
Country hold		Swing	N/A	

1932 Victorian state election: Gippsland East
Party	Candidate	Votes	%	±%
Country	Albert Lind	unopposed		
Country hold		Swing		

=== Elections in the 1920s ===
1929 Victorian state election: Gippsland East
Party	Candidate	Votes	%	±%
Country	Albert Lind	5,148	77.4	+7.3
Independent	Joseph Coate	1,502	22.6	+22.6
Total formal votes		6,650	99.4	+0.5
Informal votes		43	0.6	−0.5
Turnout		6,693	93.9	+4.9
Country hold		Swing	N/A	

1927 Victorian state election: Gippsland East
Party	Candidate	Votes	%	±%
Country	Albert Lind	4,344	70.1	
Independent	Frederick Blight	1,855	29.9	
Total formal votes		6,199	98.9	
Informal votes		69	1.1	
Turnout		6,268	89.0	
Country hold		Swing		

1924 Victorian state election: Gippsland East
Party	Candidate	Votes	%	±%
Country	Albert Lind	unopposed		
Country hold		Swing		

1921 Victorian state election: Gippsland East
Party	Candidate	Votes	%	±%
Victorian Farmers	Albert Lind	2,659	62.9	+19.7
Nationalist	John Jeffers	1,567	37.1	+1.0
Total formal votes		4,226	99.4	+5.5
Informal votes		25	0.6	−5.5
Turnout		4,251	69.2	+4.2
Victorian Farmers hold		Swing	+2.6	

1920 Victorian state election: Gippsland East
Party	Candidate	Votes	%	±%
Victorian Farmers	Albert Lind	1,624	43.3	+43.3
Nationalist	James Cameron	1,352	36.1	−31.3
Labor	Thomas Rickards	772	20.6	−12.0
Total formal votes		3,748	93.9	−3.5
Informal votes		242	6.1	+3.5
Turnout		3,990	65.0	+6.0
Two-candidate-preferred result
Victorian Farmers	Albert Lind	2,272	60.6	N/A
Nationalist	James Cameron	1,476	39.4	N/A
Victorian Farmers gain from Nationalist		Swing	N/A	

=== Elections in the 1910s ===
1917 Victorian state election: Gippsland East
Party	Candidate	Votes	%	±%
Nationalist	James Cameron	1,925	52.5	+6.5
Labor	Gordon Holmes	1,194	32.6	−12.6
Nationalist	James Bayliss	548	14.9	+14.9
Total formal votes		3,667	97.4	−0.3
Informal votes		98	2.6	+0.3
Turnout		3,765	59.0	−0.3
Two-party-preferred result
Nationalist	James Cameron		65.9	+13.4
Labor	Gordon Holmes		34.1	−13.4
Nationalist hold		Swing	+13.4	

- Two party preferred vote was estimated.

1914 Victorian state election: Gippsland East
Party	Candidate	Votes	%	±%
Liberal	James Cameron	1,788	46.0	−7.7
Labor	Edward Russell	1,756	45.2	−1.1
Independent	Donald McRae	342	8.8	+8.8
Total formal votes		3,886	97.7	−1.5
Informal votes		93	2.3	+1.5
Turnout		3,979	59.3	−9.7
Two-party-preferred result
Liberal	James Cameron	2,040	52.5	−1.2
Labor	Edward Russell	1,846	47.5	+1.2
Liberal hold		Swing	−1.2	

1911 Victorian state election: Gippsland East
Party	Candidate	Votes	%	±%
Liberal	James Cameron	2,333	53.7	−17.0
Labor	Charles Francis	2,010	46.3	+46.3
Total formal votes		4,343	99.2	+0.1
Informal votes		37	0.8	−0.1
Turnout		4,380	69.0	+20.6
Liberal hold		Swing	N/A	
