= Bemm River, Victoria =

Bemm River
- Town
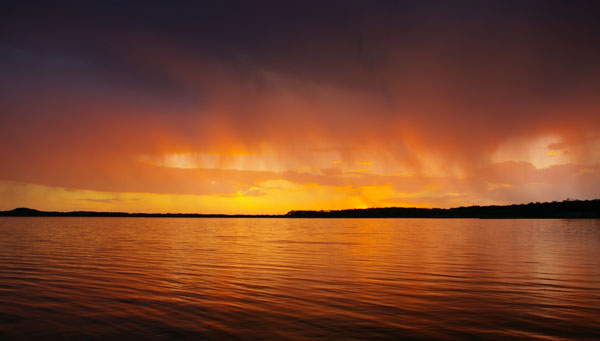
- Sunset over Sydenham Inlet

- Coordinates: 37°45′0″S 148°58′0″E
- Country: Australia
- State: Victoria
- LGA: Shire of East Gippsland
- Location: 431 km (268 mi) E of Melbourne; 145 km (90 mi) E of Bairnsdale; 59 km (37 mi) E of Orbost; 38 km (24 mi) SW of Cann River

Government
  - State electorate: Gippsland East
  - Federal division: Gippsland

Population
  - Total: 72 (SAL 2021)
- Postcode: 3889

Bemm River is a town in the Shire of East Gippsland, Victoria Australia. At the 2021 census, Bemm River and the surrounding area had a population of 72.

== Description ==
The locality surrounds Sydenham Inlet and much of its area to the north is state forest, while Cape Conran Coastal Park adjoins the western shores of the inlet and Croajingolong National Park adjoins its eastern shores.

The area is renowned for its bream fishing, which gives it its second name, 'The Bream Capital'. There are several tourist accommodation places in the town. There is a general store and a pub which is also a licensed restaurant. There was also a local radio station, Bemm River Local Radio (90.9 FM) that broadcast during the Victorian school holidays.

The Post Office opened on 1 July 1911, closed in 1920, reopened in 1933, then closed again in 1982.

== Sydenham Inlet ==
Bemm River township is situated on the north-western shore of Sydenham Inlet, a natural coastal inlet that stretches over to the sand hills of the Tasman Sea shoreline of the South Pacific Ocean. The inlet is fed by the Bemm River in the west and the Little River in the east. It is 4 kilometres (2.5 mi) from the beach, and 10 kilometres (6.2 mi) from Py-yoot Bay (/ˈpaɪˈjuːt/).
