= Curlip =

History

Australia
- Launched: 1890
- Decommissioned: 1911
- Fate: Wrecked on Marlo beach, Australia

General characteristics
- Type: Paddle steamer

PS Curlip was a paddle steamer built in a Tabbara sawmill in 1889 by Samuel Richardson and his sons. It was operated along the Snowy River in Australia's Gippsland region between 1890 and 1919, before being washed out to sea, and broken on Marlo beach, by a flash flood.

== 2008 replica ==
The Orbost and district community started a project in 2002 to construct a live steam-powered replica, albeit somewhat larger than the original to meet safety regulations and carry additional passengers for commercial reasons, the paddle steamer Curlip II with the assistance of grants from the Federal and Victorian governments. Construction was started in earnest by shipwright Bill Jones in August 2006, and with the assistance of roughly 200 volunteers (a core group of 10 performing the majority of the work), she was finally completed and launched on the Snowy River in late November 2008. The vessel is operated by a not for profit organisation, P S Curlip Inc, who offered regular cruises and private charters on the lower reaches of the river and its estuary, until 2015. Paddle steamer Curlip had its survey status revoked in 2015–16 due to the inability of the management to provide regular slipping and maintenance, compounded by the infestation and attack by Teredo navalis, the marine shipworm, that attached to and bored holes in the vessel's underwater hull.

A new board of management took over custodial care and maintenance of paddle steamer Curlip in October 2016. The not for profit management team is made up from members of the Gippsland Lakes Classic Boat Club, who took up office, as the new board of P.S.Curlip Inc, with the express purpose of relocating the vessel to the Gippsland Lakes at Paynesville, where the vessel is now located on leased hardstand facilities, in anticipation of a crowd funded campaign to rebuild the underwater hull of the vessel. Paddle steamer Curlip will also be fitted with a renewable and sustainable solar-powered and fresh-water regeneration plant to enable her self-sufficiency in her new area of eco tourism operation within the world listed, Ramsar Wetlands of the Mitchell River Delta and the Gippsland Lakes, between Bairnsdale and Paynesville, in East Gippsland, Victoria Australia. Paddle steamer Curlip was given permission from the government marine regulatory authority, AMSA, to make the historic open ocean voyage, crossing the Snowy River Bar, along Bass Strait, entering the Gippsland Lakes via the Lakes Entrance bar. Paddle steamer Curlip became the first paddle steamer to make an open ocean voyage since World War II.
