= 2008 Gippsland by-election =

Australian federal by-election

- 28 June 2008
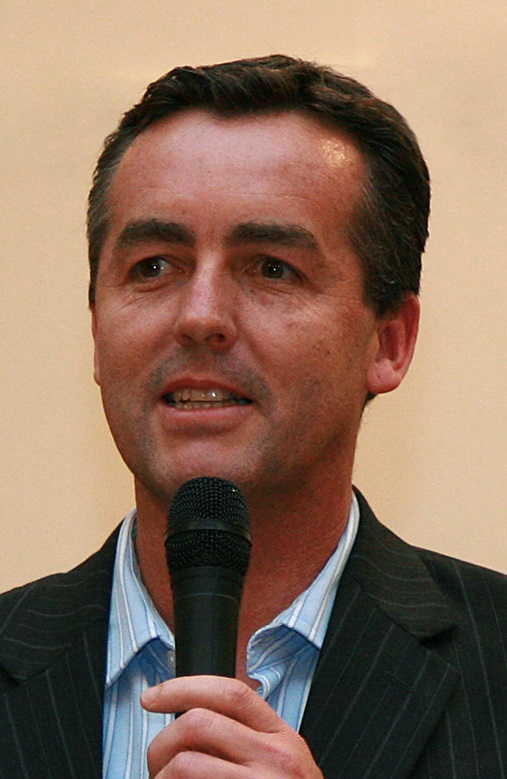

	First party	Second party	Third party
Candidate	Darren Chester	Darren McCubbin	Rohan Fitzgerald
Party	National	Labor	Liberal
Popular vote	32,921	22,652	17,249
Percentage	39.60%	28.41%	20.72%
Swing	▼8.77pp	▼8.14pp	▲20.72pp
TPP	61.99%	38.01%
TPP swing	▲6.08pp	▼6.08pp
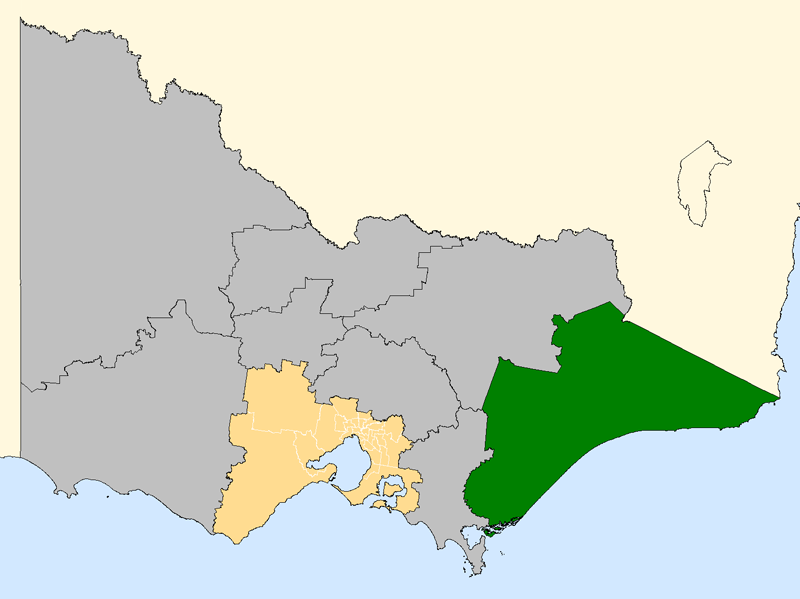
- Gippsland (green) within Victoria.
MP before election
Peter McGauran
National
Elected MP
Darren Chester
National

The 2008 Gippsland by-election was held for the Australian House of Representatives seat of Gippsland on 28 June 2008. It was triggered by the resignation of National Party MP Peter McGauran.

The writ for the by-election was issued on 19 May 2008. Nominations closed at 12 noon on 5 June 2008. The declaration of nominations, including the ballot order, was revealed the following day, 6 June 2008. The electorate was contested on the same boundaries drawn for Gippsland at the 2007 federal election.

The by-election saw the National Party retain the seat with an increased margin, electing candidate Darren Chester.

== Background ==
At the 2007 federal election, the opposition Labor Party defeated the incumbent Liberal-National coalition government. This marked the first change of government in over 11 years. This meant a transition from the government frontbench to the opposition backbench for several Liberal Party and National Party politicians. It was speculated that a number of former ministers would not serve out their terms but resign their seats early. This speculation later became reality as Peter McGauran, Alexander Downer, Mark Vaile, and Peter Costello all resigned prior to the next federal election.

On 4 April 2008, McGauran became the first former Howard government minister returned at the 2007 election to announce his resignation. McGauran first won the seat of Gippsland at the 1983 federal election. He retained the seat at every subsequent election. At the 2007 election, McGauran won the seat for the National Party by a two-party preferred margin of 55.91% to Labor's 44.09%.

McGauran had reportedly lined up a job in the racing industry with Thoroughbred Breeders Australia.

== Candidates ==
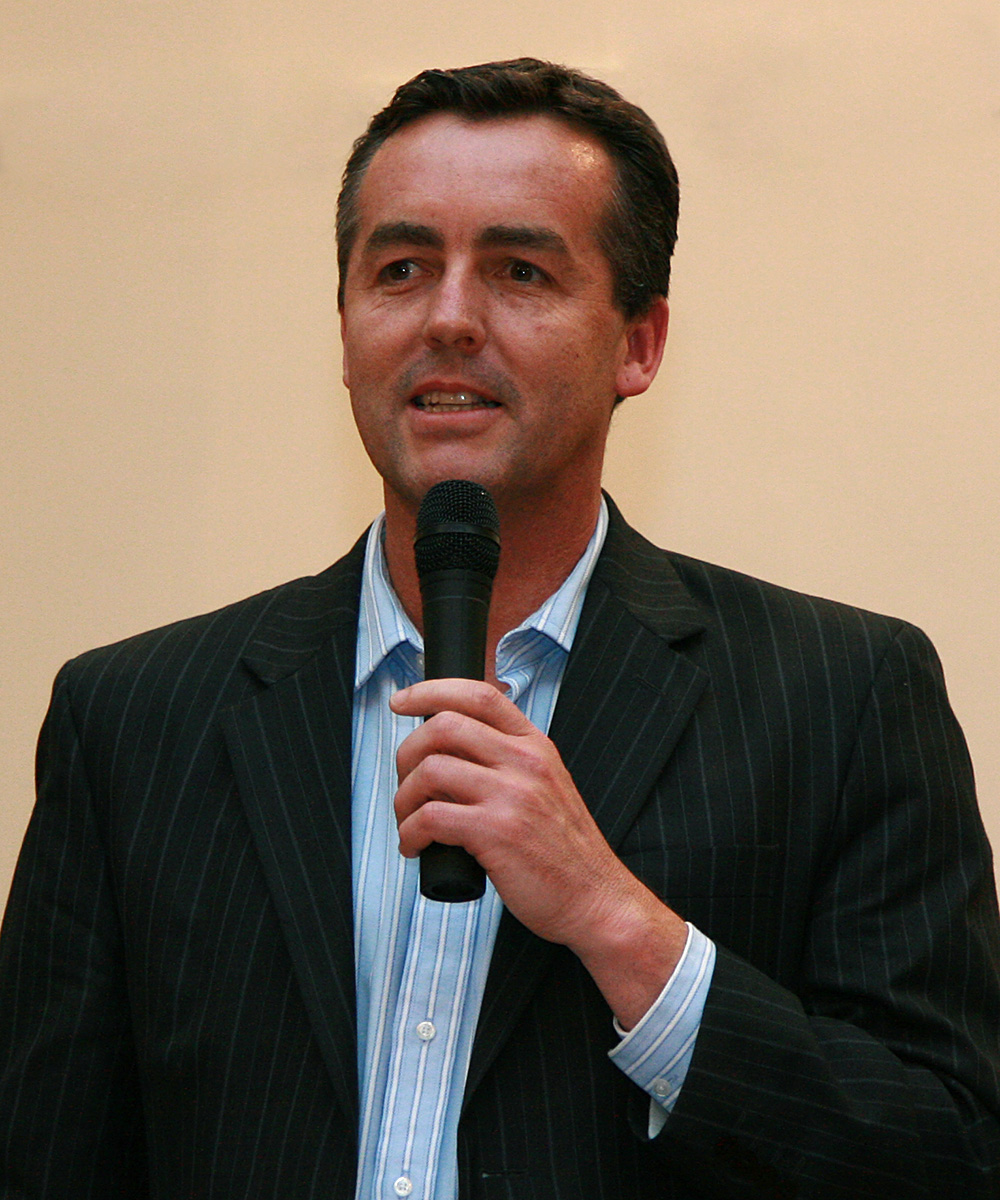
National Party candidate and eventual winner, Darren Chester

Five candidates contested the by-election. They are listed below in ballot order.

- Australian Greens – Malcolm McKelvie, doctor from Yarragon.
- Liberal Party of Australia – Rohan Fitzgerald, senior manager with the Central Gippsland Health Service. He is based in Traralgon.
- Liberty and Democracy Party – Ben Buckley, pilot and a councillor of East Gippsland Shire Council. Buckley is a perennial candidate who contested Gippsland as an independent in 1984, 1990, 1993, 1996, 2001 and 2007, and as a One Nation candidate in 2004. He is based in Benambra.
- Australian Labor Party – Darren McCubbin, Mayor of Wellington Shire at the time of nomination but has since resigned in order to focus on the campaign. He won preselection over Latrobe City Deputy Mayor David Wilson. He is based in Sale.
- National Party of Australia – Darren Chester, chief of staff to Nationals leader in Victoria Peter Ryan. He won preselection over retired army officer Russell Smith. He is based in Lakes Entrance.

== A joint Coalition candidate? ==
Following McGauran's resignation announcement, Craig Ingram, independent Victorian MLA for the seat of Gippsland East, told reporters that he was considering contesting the by-election as an independent. Subsequently, Liberal Senator Bill Heffernan made an offer to Ingram to run with the joint endorsement of the Liberal and National parties. Heffernan saw this as the first step in a potential merger between the two parties. However, the idea was rejected by both party organisations, and it is doubtful whether Heffernan had the authority to make such an offer. Soon after that, Ingram announced that he would not be running in any capacity.

== Results ==
Darren Chester retained the seat for the National Party with an increased margin.

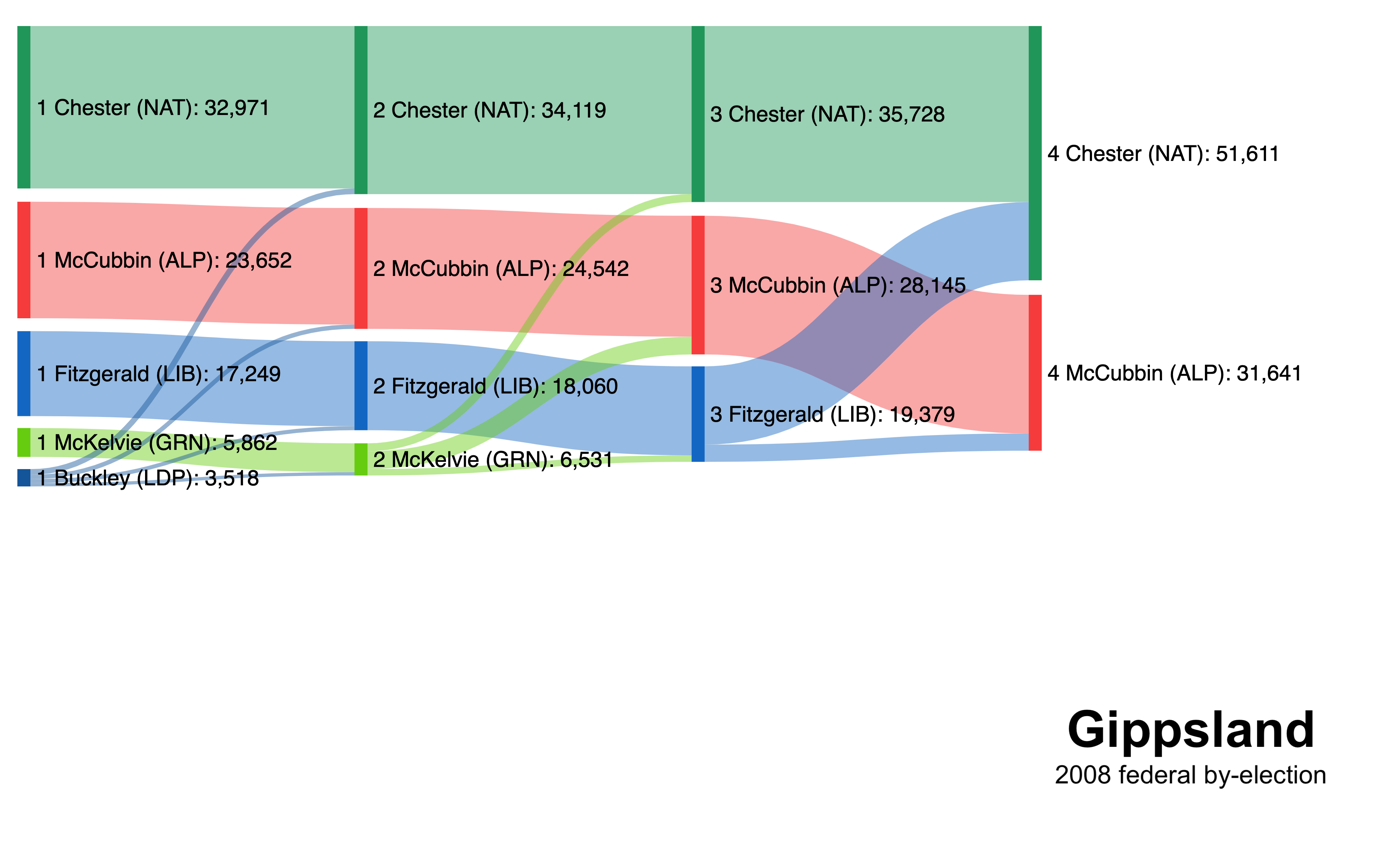
The distribution of preferences in the by-election resulted in the election of Darren Chester.

Gippsland by-election, 2008
Party	Candidate	Votes	%	±%
National	Darren Chester	32,971	39.60	−8.77
Labor	Darren McCubbin	23,652	28.41	−8.14
Liberal	Rohan Fitzgerald	17,249	20.72	+20.72
Greens	Malcolm McKelvie	5,862	7.04	+1.50
Liberty & Democracy	Ben Buckley	3,518	4.23	+4.23
Total formal votes		83,252	97.12	+0.10
Informal votes		2,465	2.88	−0.10
Turnout		85,717	89.68	−5.98
Two-party-preferred result
National	Darren Chester	51,611	61.99	+6.08
Labor	Darren McCubbin	31,641	38.01	−6.08
National hold		Swing	+6.08	

== See also ==
- List of Australian federal by-elections
