= RBS =

RBS may refer to:

== Arts and media ==
- Grupo RBS, Brazilian media group
  - RBS TV
- Republic Broadcasting System (RBS TV), now GMA Network, owned by GMA Network Inc., Philippines
- RBS TV (Latvia), a defunct Latvian television station
- Red Band Society, a Fox TV show that aired from 2014-15
- Real Bout Fatal Fury Special, a fighting game
- Rolling ball sculpture

== Banking ==
- The Royal Bank of Scotland, a retail arm of NatWest Group
  - RBS International, the offshore arm of NatWest Group

== Education ==
- Rotterdam Business School
- Rutgers Business School
- Riga Business School

== Management ==
- Resource breakdown structure
- Risk breakdown structure

== Places ==
- Ramat Beit Shemesh, a group of neighbourhoods in Beit Shemesh, Israel
- Orbost Airport, Victoria, Australia (IATA:RBS)

== Science and technology ==
=== Biology and medicine ===
- Reduction breast surgery, commonly known as breast reduction
- Ribosomal Binding Site, in biology
- Roberts syndrome

=== Computing ===
- Reference Broadcast Time Synchronization
- Remote backup service
- Robbed-bit signaling
- Role-based security
- Rule-based system

=== Other uses in science and technology ===
- Radio Base Station, in wireless communications
- Roussin's black salt, a chemical compound
- Rutherford backscattering spectrometry, an analytical technique

== Transport ==
- Radar Brake Support, Suzuki's Advanced Emergency Braking System
- Redundant Braking System, a type of parachute system
- Regionalverkehr Bern-Solothurn, Swiss company
- Reusable Booster System, a United States Air Force research program circa 2010 to 2012
- Revised British Standard, a bullhead rail profile
- Rugby–Birmingham–Stafford Line, a railway line in England
- Orbost Airport, Victoria, Australia (IATA:RBS)

== See also ==
- RB (disambiguation)
- RBS-15, a long-range missile
- RBS 70, an anti-aircraft weapon
