= RBSS =

RBSS may refer to:

- Railway Board Secretariat Service, in India
- Raqqa Is Being Slaughtered Silently, a citizen journalist group reporting Syrian war news and human rights abuses
- RBSS RB Stereo Sound, a radio station in Palermo, Italy
- Red Bull Street Style, a freestyle football competition
- Reuters Business Sector Scheme, developers of The Refinitiv Business Classification
- Ringer's balanced salt solution, a balanced salt solution
- Royal Bay Secondary School, in Colwood, Victoria, British Columbia, Canada

== See also ==
- RBS (disambiguation)
