= Little River (Sydenham Inlet, East Gippsland) =

River in Victoria, Australia

Little
- Mouth of the Little River in Victoria

Location
- Country: Australia
- State: Victoria
- Region: South East Corner (IBRA), East Gippsland
- LGA: Shire of East Gippsland
- Town: Bemm River (town)

Physical characteristics
- Source: Mount Cann
  - location: St George Plain Flora Reserve
  - elevation: 108 m (354 ft)
- Mouth: Sydenham Inlet, Bass Strait
  - location: Cape Conran Coastal Park
  - coordinates: 37°45′23″S 148°59′55″E
  - elevation: 0 m (0 ft)
- Length: 16 km (9.9 mi)

Basin features
- River system: Bemm River catchment
- Tributaries
  - right: Mountain Creek (East Gippsland)
- National park: Cape Conran CP

The Little River is a perennial river of the Bemm River catchment, in the East Gippsland region of the Australian state of Victoria.

== Course and features ==
The Little River rises below near Mount Cann, in the St George Plain Flora Reserve. The river flows generally south, through the Cape Conran Coastal Park, joined by one minor tributary, before reaching its mouth with Bass Strait via Sydenham Inlet in the Shire of East Gippsland, near the settlement of Bemm River. The river descends 106 metres (348 ft) over its 16-kilometre (9.9 mi) course.

The Little River sub-catchment area is managed by the East Gippsland Catchment Management Authority.

== See also ==
- List of rivers of Australia
