= Darren Chester =

Australian politician (born 1967)

The Honourable Darren Chester MP
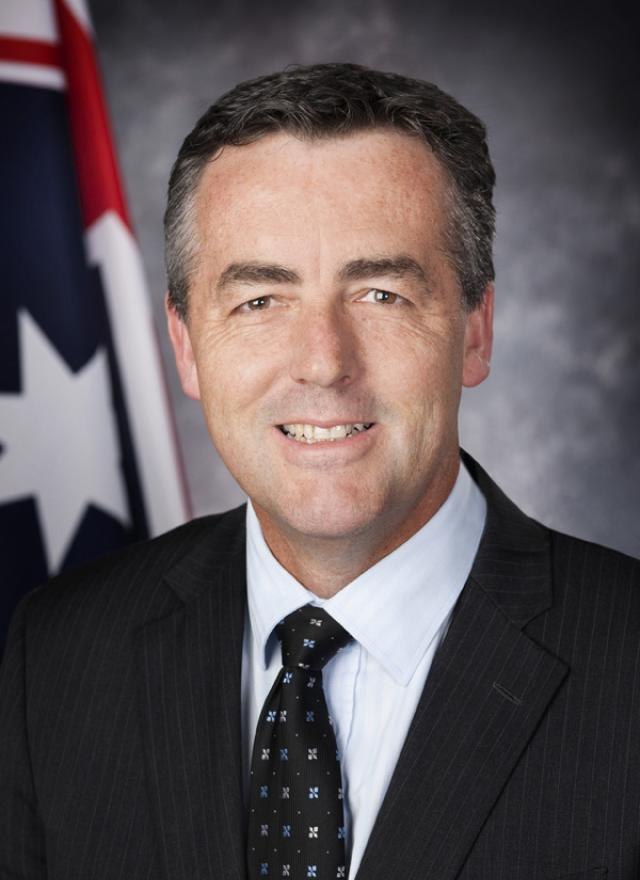
- Official portrait, 2015

Deputy Leader of the National Party
- Incumbent
- Assumed office 11 March 2026
- Leader: Matt Canavan
- Preceded by: Kevin Hogan

Leader of the National Party in the House of Representatives
- Incumbent
- Assumed office 11 March 2026
- Leader: Matt Canavan
- Preceded by: David Littleproud (As leader)

Shadow Minister for Agriculture, Fisheries and Forestry
- Incumbent
- Assumed office 16 March 2026
- Leader: Angus Taylor
- Preceded by: Michaelia Cash (as Acting Shadow Minister for Agriculture)
Previous shadow ministerial positions
Shadow Minister for Veterans Affairs
In office 17 February 2026 – 16 March 2026
| Leader | Angus Taylor |
| Preceded by | Angus Taylor (acting) |
| Succeeded by | Michael McCormack |
In office 28 May 2025 – 21 January 2026
| Leader | Sussan Ley |
| Preceded by | Barnaby Joyce |
| Succeeded by | Angus Taylor (acting) |
Shadow Minister for Regional Education Shadow Minister for Regional Development, Local Government and Territories
In office 4 January 2023 – 28 May 2025
| Leader | Peter Dutton; Sussan Ley |
| Preceded by | Andrew Gee |
| Succeeded by | Anne Webster |
Shadow Parliamentary-Secretary for Roads and Regional Transport
In office 14 September 2010 – 18 September 2013
| Leader | Tony Abbott |
| Preceded by | Don Randall (as Shadow Parliamentary-Secretary for Roads and Transport) |
| Succeeded by | Stephen Jones (as Shadow Parliamentary-Secretary for Regional Development and Infrastructure) |
Ministerial positions
Deputy Leader of the House
In office 5 March 2018 – 2 July 2021
| Prime Minister | Malcolm Turnbull; Scott Morrison |
| Preceded by | Michael McCormack |
| Succeeded by | David Gillespie |
In office 18 February 2016 – 20 December 2017
| Prime Minister | Malcolm Turnbull |
| Preceded by | Luke Hartsuyker |
| Succeeded by | Michael McCormack |
Minister for Veterans' Affairs & Minister for Defence Personnel
In office 5 March 2018 – 2 July 2021
| Prime Minister | Malcolm Turnbull; Scott Morrison |
| Preceded by | Michael McCormack |
| Succeeded by | Andrew Gee |
Minister for Regional Development
In office 27 October 2017 – 20 December 2017
| Prime Minister | Malcolm Turnbull |
| Preceded by | Fiona Nash |
| Succeeded by | John McVeigh (as Minister for Regional Development, Territories and Local Government) |
Minister for Local Government and Territories
In office 27 July 2017 – 20 December 2017
| Prime Minister | Malcolm Turnbull |
| Preceded by | Fiona Nash |
| Succeeded by | John McVeigh (as Minister for Regional Development, Territories and Local Government) |
Minister for Infrastructure and Transport
In office 18 February 2016 – 20 December 2017
| Prime Minister | Malcolm Turnbull |
| Preceded by | Warren Truss (Infrastructure and Regional Development) |
| Succeeded by | Barnaby Joyce |
Assistant Minister for Defence
In office 21 September 2015 – 18 February 2016
| Prime Minister | Malcolm Turnbull |
| Preceded by | Stuart Robert |
| Succeeded by | Michael McCormack |

Member of the Australian Parliament for Gippsland
- Incumbent
- Assumed office 28 June 2008
- Preceded by: Peter McGauran

Personal details
- Born: Darren Jeffrey Chester; 13 September 1967 (age 59) Sale, Victoria, Australia
- Party: National
- Occupation: Journalist and political adviser
- Website: darrenchester.com.au

Darren Jeffrey Chester (born 13 September 1967) is an Australian politician who is the deputy leader of the National Party of Australia. He has been the member of parliament (MP) for the Victorian division of Gippsland since 2008. Chester had served as the Minister for Veterans' Affairs and the Minister for Defence Personnel between March 2018 and July 2021 in the Turnbull and Morrison governments. He was also Minister Assisting the Prime Minister for the Centenary of ANZAC until May 2019.

Chester served as the Parliamentary Secretary to the Minister for Defence in the Abbott ministry from September 2013 to September 2015. In the Turnbull government he was appointed Assistant Minister for Defence from 21 September 2015; and between 18 February 2016 and 20 December 2017, Chester served as the Minister for Infrastructure and Transport following a rearrangement in the First Turnbull Ministry. He briefly served in the Second Turnbull Ministry as the acting Minister for Regional Development and as the acting Minister for Local Government and Territories between October and December 2017, following the resignation of Fiona Nash.

Chester was viewed as a potential candidate to replace Barnaby Joyce as National Party leader in February 2018; however he chose not to contest the leadership.

== Early life ==
Chester was born in Sale, Victoria, the son of a plumber, and was one of five children.

Prior to entering federal politics, he worked as a newspaper and television journalist throughout Gippsland and was chief of staff to Peter Ryan, the leader of the Nationals in the Victorian state parliament.

== Politics ==
=== Early involvement ===
Chester contested Gippsland East as the National Party candidate at the 2002 Victorian state election, losing to independent Craig Ingram. In 2004, he unsuccessfully stood for National Party preselection for the Senate position held by Julian McGauran. McGauran retained his party endorsement and was re-elected later that year, only to defect to the Liberals in 2006.

=== House of Representatives ===
Chester was elected to the House of Representatives at the 2008 by-election caused by the resignation of Peter McGauran, and re-elected at the 2010 and 2013 elections.

He was appointed Shadow Parliamentary Secretary for Roads and Regional Transport in September 2010; and appointed as Parliamentary Secretary to the Minister for Defence in September 2013.

In June 2015 he became the first member of the National Party to announce support for same-sex marriage and a conscience vote on the issue for members of the Coalition. The move catalysed a public breakdown in Chester's relationship with his local Nationals branches in Gippsland, who moved a motion to revoke his party endorsement for the 2016 election. Chaotic scenes ensued at a Gippsland Nationals branch meeting where Chester was reported to have verbally abused local party members, with Chester subsequently attacking The Australian newspaper for its coverage of the controversy.

Public scrutiny of taxpayer-funded travel allowances usage by MPs has embroiled Chester in controversy. The Sydney Morning Herald revealed that between 2008 and 2016, Chester charged taxpayers $407,000 on private air charters to travel to Canberra for parliamentary sittings, despite most MPs using normal commercial air services or driving. On 27 January 2016, Chester charged taxpayers $876 for a work trip to Melbourne on which he completed the purchase of a two-bedroom apartment in Ivanhoe as an investment property and to later attended a Melbourne Victory soccer match.

During the ongoing leadership tensions between Barnaby Joyce and Michael McCormack after the former resigned in February 2018 and the latter became federal leader, Chester has been a prominent leader of the McCormack faction and was notably rewarded with a ministerial appointment when McCormack first become leader. He won a subsequent promotion to Cabinet after McCormack defeated a leadership challenge by Joyce in February 2020. It would later emerge in May 2020 during the recriminations over McCormack's refusal to support a planned run for federal parliament by NSW Deputy Premier John Barilaro in the 2020 Eden-Monaro by-election that Chester was in a WhatsApp group where messages about Barilaro and his wife were exchanged with colleagues Damian Drum and Kevin Hogan.

For supporting incumbent McCormack in the 2021 Nationals leadership spill, Chester was stripped of his ministerial portfolios by new leader Joyce.

Chester has been a frequent critic of Barnaby Joyce, labelling him ‘incoherent’, criticising his leadership style and scepticism of climate science.

Chester was comfortably re-elected at the 2022 Australian federal election.

Chester challenged incumbent Nationals Party leader Barnaby Joyce along with David Littleproud, the incumbent deputy leader in a three-way race for the leadership of the party on Monday 30 May 2022, after the incumbent Liberal/National Coalition government lost office to the Labor opposition. The Nationals party room got bigger, however, their coalition partner suffered seat losses. Chester along with Joyce lost to Littleproud on that day. Chester was eventually not included in the subsequent shadow ministry. However, on 4 January 2023, he was appointed to the outer shadow ministry as Shadow Minister for Regional Education and Shadow Minister for Regional Development, Local Government and Territories.

Following the resignation of David Littleproud as Nationals Party leader in March 2026, Chester was elected Deputy Leader under new leader Matt Canavan.

== Personal life ==
Chester lives in Lakes Entrance, Victoria, with his wife, Julie, and their four children.

Chester supports the Sydney Swans in the Australian Football League.

Parliament of Australia
| Preceded by Peter McGauran | Member for Gippsland; 2008–present | Incumbent |
Political offices
| Preceded by Michael McCormack | Minister for Veterans' Affairs; 2018–2021 | Succeeded by Andrew Gee |
| Preceded by Michael McCormack | Minister for Defence Personnel; 2018–2021 | Succeeded by Andrew Gee |
| Preceded by Michael McCormack | Minister Assisting the Prime Minister for the Centenary of ANZAC; 2018–2019 | Succeeded by None |
| Preceded by Warren Truss as Minister for Infrastructure and Regional Development | Minister for Infrastructure and Transport; 2016–2017 | Succeeded by Barnaby Joyce |
| Preceded by Stuart Robert | Assistant Minister for Defence; 2015–2016 | Succeeded by Michael McCormack |
