= Percival Bazeley =

Australian scientist (1909–1991)

Percival Landon Bazeley CBE was an Australian scientist of biotechnology and public health.

== Biography ==
Born in Orbost, Victoria, Australia on 2 March 1909, Bazeley attended the school of veterinary science at the University of Sydney, graduating in 1938. During his course of study, he undertook employment at Australia's Commonwealth Serum Laboratories (CSL) during vacation periods. Subsequently, he joined CSL on a full-time basis in 1939. Val Bazeley joined the Australian Army Militia in June 1939, and began full-time military service in the Australian Imperial Force on 23 May 1941.

With the discovery and subsequent large-scale production of the wonder drug penicillin, a project for the production of penicillin in Australia became a high priority defence need. Bazeley was brought back from New Guinea, where he was a captain in the 2/8th Australian Armoured Regiment, to head the team given the task of producing penicillin. Dr. Bazeley visited the United States and returned to set up production at CSL. In the face of great difficulties, given wartime conditions, his personal contribution to the success of the project cannot be underestimated. He was a driving force and spent long hours in the laboratories grappling with the problems of the new venture. By Christmas of 1943, the first Australian penicillin had arrived in New Guinea to save countless lives. In the months to follow, enormous quantities of penicillin were produced in the primitive CSL plant, and Australia can boast of being the first country in the world to have penicillin available for its civilian population, having met not only the needs of its own defence forces, but also those of the American allies in the southwest Pacific. It was during this period that Captain Bazeley was promoted to major.

With the end of the war, Bazeley returned to university studies, and graduated as MB BS (Bachelor of Medicine, Bachelor of Surgery) from the University of Melbourne in 1950. By then, he had received the Order of the British Empire for his work on penicillin.

The early 1950s saw Dr. Bazeley at the University of Pittsburgh in the United States working with Jonas Salk and his team towards the production of a poliomyelitis vaccine. With the success of that project, he returned to Australia to once again find himself given the task of pioneering the production of an important new weapon against disease. Twenty-five million doses of Salk poliomyelitis vaccine were produced at CSL in the 1950s and 1960s under Dr. Bazeley's leadership as director of the government institution. This led to widespread recognition. He was awarded a Commander of the Order of the British Empire and was renowned in the general community where, for example, he was chosen as Victorian Father of the Year in 1958.

In 1961, Dr. Bazeley returned to the United States to work with Jonas Salk at the Salk Institute in La Jolla, California. Subsequently, he joined the University of California, San Diego's University Hospital (now "UCSD Medical Center") as a full professor of medicine. At this same time, he also personally funded and maintained a private medical research facility outside Salt Lake City, Utah. University of California mandatory retirement rules forced Dr. Bazeley into private medical practice at the age of 67.

He died 10 September 1991.
