= James Cameron (Victorian politician) =

Australian politician

James Cameron (1846 – 13 July 1922) was a Scottish-born Australian politician.

He was born in Logie-Almond in Perthshire to farmer Alexander Cameron and Anne Pullar. The family moved to Victoria in 1854, settling first at Batesford and then at Beremboke. Cameron became a farmer at Orbost, and also developed business interests in mines at Nowa Nowa and in farm machinery. On 30 April 1879 he married Sarah Scouller, with whom he had seven children. He served on Tambo Shire Council from 1888 to 1892 (president 1885–86, 1890–91) and on Orbost Shire Council from 1892 to 1902 (president 1892–93). In 1902 he won a by-election for the Victorian Legislative Assembly seat of Gippsland East. He moved the no-confidence motion against the Bent government in 1908, and was a minister without portfolio from 1909 to 1913. Later a Nationalist, he held his seat until 1920, when he was defeated by a Victorian Farmers' Union candidate. Cameron died in Orbost in 1922.

Victorian Legislative Assembly
| Preceded by Henry Foster | Member for Gippsland East; 1902–1920 | Succeeded by Albert Lind |
