= Orbost Airport =

- IATA: RBS; ICAO: YORB

Summary
- Airport type: Public
- Operator: East Gippsland Shire Council
- Serves: Orbost, Victoria
- Location: Marlo, Victoria
- Elevation AMSL: 94 ft / 29 m
- Coordinates: 37°47′24″S 148°36′36″E

Map
- Location in Victoria

Runways
Direction	Length		Surface
Direction	m	ft	Surface
07/25	1,140	3,740	Grass/sand
- Sources: Australian AIP and aerodrome chart

Orbost Airport (IATA: RBS, ICAO: YORB) is an uncontrolled aerodrome located 394km east of Melbourne and 5 nautical miles (9.3 km; 5.8 mi) northeast of Marlo, near Orbost, Victoria, Australia. Orbost Airport is a certified airport, conforming to regulatory standards published by the Civil Aviation Safety Authority (CASA)

Orbost Airport accommodates an estimated annual aircraft movement of between 1,000 and 1,500 flights and plays a strategically important role in times of fire emergency and to connect locals with health services in metropolitan Melbourne. The airport was awarded ‘National Small Regional Aerodrome of the Year in 2021 and again in 2023 by the Australian Airports Association. Key factors cited for the win included the airport's commitment to vegetation management, upgrading security and wildlife-proof fencing, and landside improvements, resulting in enhanced safety for all stakeholders.

== See also ==
- List of airports in Victoria, Australia
