= Consulate General of Australia, Houston =

Diplomatic mission of Australia to the USA in Houston

Australian Consul-General in Houston
- Incumbent; Gabrielle Hall since 12 October 2023
- Residence: Houston
- Formation: 1982
- Website: Australian Consulate-General, Houston

The Australian Consul-General and Senior Trade and Investment Commissioner in Houston represents the Australian Government in Houston, Texas. Although it is run and managed by Austrade, the Consulate-General carries out visiting and reporting responsibilities on behalf of the Australian Ambassador in Washington for Texas, Arkansas, Oklahoma and Louisiana.

It is in suite 1310 of 3009 Post Oak Boulevard in Uptown Houston.

== Consulate history ==
On 11 February 1982, Deputy Prime Minister Doug Anthony announced the opening of a new consulate-general jointly managed by DFAT and Austrade in Houston, Texas, thereby becoming the fifth Australian consulate-general in the United States. In 1993, the posting was fully transferred to Austrade management and was closed on 31 December 1996 due to financial constraints and a restructuring of resources to the Austrade consulates in Atlanta and Los Angeles. Following the closure, the Australian Government appointed an Honorary Consul in Houston, Nana Booker, who served from 1999 until 2015. In 2005 Booker was appointed as an Honorary Member of the Order of Australia (AM) for her continued service as honorary consul.

The consulate-general was reopened in March 2015 to seek major trade opportunities for Australian companies and foster closer education and research links. The opening had previously been flagged in media in June 2014. After its reopening the Parliamentary Secretary to the Foreign Minister, Steven Ciobo, praised former honorary consul (and now Honorary Consul Emeritus) Booker's work: "The Australian Government is highly appreciative of the good work done by the Honorary Consul, Ms Nana Booker, over the years. The opening of the Consulate General is solid proof of the importance of her work and of our high regard for it."

== Consuls-General ==
Name	Start of term	End of term	References
E. J. L. Ride	November 1982	1986	
Bob Whitty	1986	1989	
Peter Urban	1989	1994	
G. McHugh	1994	31 December 1996	
Posting closed
Nana Booker AM (Honorary Consul)	1999	2015	
Alastair Walton	November 2015	23 June 2017	
Peter McGauran	26 January 2018	December 2020	
Benson Saulo	January 2021	July 2023	
Gabrielle Hall	January 2024	incumbent	
