= Peter McGauran =

Australian politician (born 1955)

The Honourable Peter McGauran

Chair of the Australian Turf Club
- In office 29 August 2022 – 9 July 2025
- Preceded by: Matthew McGrath

Member of the Australian Parliament for Gippsland
- In office 5 March 1983 – 9 April 2008
- Preceded by: Peter Nixon
- Succeeded by: Darren Chester

Personal details
- Born: 16 November 1955 (age 71) Yallourn, Victoria, Australia
- Party: National Party of Australia
- Education: University of Melbourne
- Occupation: Barrister

Peter John McGauran (born 16 November 1955) is an Australian former politician who served as a National Party member of the Australian House of Representatives. He represented the Division of Gippsland in Victoria from 5 March 1983 to 9 April 2008. He is the brother of former Senator Julian McGauran. He was born in Yallourn, Victoria, and was educated at Xavier College in Kew and the University of Melbourne. He was a barrister and solicitor before entering politics.

McGauran was an active member of the Young Nationals and was accorded the accolade of 'Mr YNP Pin-Up Boy' at the 1983 NSW Young Nationals State Ball held in Moree.

McGauran was appointed Minister for Science and Technology in the Howard government in 1996, however, on 26 September 1997, he was forced to resign his position due to ministerial impropriety in relation to the "Travel Rorts" affair. He returned to the ministry in 1998, as Minister for the Arts and the Centenary of Federation 1998–2001, Minister for Science 2001–2004, and Minister for Citizenship and Multicultural Affairs 2004–2005. In July 2005 he was promoted to Cabinet and became Minister for Agriculture, Fisheries and Forestry, a position he held until 3 December 2007, when the Howard Government was defeated by the Australian Labor Party under the leadership of Kevin Rudd at the 24 November election.

After the resignation of Nationals leader Mark Vaile, McGauran was expected to seek the leadership; however he dropped out of the race, stating that it was time for younger members to contribute to the party, and that he looked forward to using his experience to help them.

On 4 April 2008, McGauran announced he would shortly be resigning from parliament, citing plans to pursue interests in the thoroughbred racing industry. His resignation became effective on 9 April. He was succeeded by Darren Chester in the resulting June 2008 by-election.

After announcing his resignation, he revealed events that occurred in 1996, where he was physically assaulted by Alphonse Gangitano, an underworld figure who was later murdered. In January 2018, McGauran was appointed by Trade Minister Steven Ciobo as the Consul-General of Australia in Houston, Texas.

== Racing career ==
From 2012 to 2016 McGauran served as CEO of Racing Australia.

He has held various other positions in the racing industry such as at Thoroughbred Breeders Australia, Aushorse Marketing, Racing NSW and Tabcorp.

In August 2022, McGauran was elected chair of the Australian Turf Club (ATC).

In July 2025, McGauran resigned from the ATC board after a proposal to sell Rosehill Racecourse was voted against by the club's membership.

Parliament of Australia
Preceded by Peter Nixon	Member for Gippsland; 1983–2008	Succeeded by Darren Chester
Political offices
Preceded by Peter Cook	Minister for Science & Technology; 1996–1997	Succeeded by Nick Minchin
Preceded by Richard Alston	Minister for the Arts and the Centenary of Federation; 1998–2001	Succeeded by Rod Kemp as Minister for the Arts and Sport
Preceded by Nick Minchin	Minister for Science; 2001–2004	Succeeded by Brendan Nelson
Preceded by Gary Hardgrave	Minister for Citizenship and Multicultural Affairs; 2004–2005	Succeeded by John Cobb
Preceded by Warren Truss	Minister for Agriculture, Fisheries and Forestry; 2005–2007	Succeeded by Tony Burke
Diplomatic posts
Preceded by Alastair Walton	Consul-General of Australia in Houston; 2018–2020	Succeeded by Benson Saulo
