= Tabbara =

Tabbara is an Arabic surname. People with the surname include:

- Bahij Tabbara (born 1929), Lebanese politician
- Bilal Tabbara (born 1993), Lebanese basketball player
- Hani Bahjat Tabbara (born 1939), Jordanian diplomat
- Khaled Tabbara, member of the American Indie pop duo Munnycat
- Marwan Tabbara (born 1984), Canadian politician
- Saïd bin Saïd Tabbara (died 2016), Bahraini-Lebanese educator
- Yaser Tabbara, Syrian American lawyer
