= Henry Foster (Australian politician) =

Australian politician

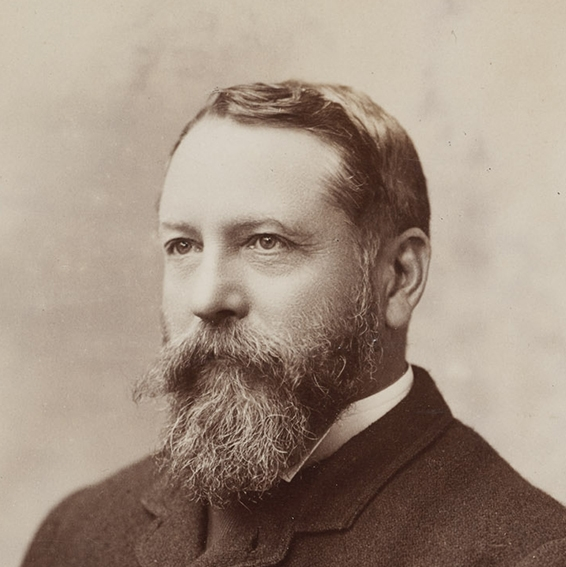

Minister of Water Supply
- In office 28 September 1894 – 5 December 1899
- Premier: George Turner
- Preceded by: James McColl
- Succeeded by: Alfred Outtrim

Minister of Mines
- In office 28 September 1894 – 5 December 1899
- Premier: George Turner
- Preceded by: James McColl
- Succeeded by: Alfred Outtrim

Member of the Victorian Legislative Assembly for Gippsland East
- In office 1 April 1889 – 25 May 1902
- Preceded by: Seat created
- Succeeded by: James Cameron

Personal details
- Born: 26 January 1846 Coventry, England
- Died: 25 May 1902 (aged 56) Clifton Hill, Victoria, Australia

Henry Foster (26 January 1846 – 25 May 1902) was an English-born Australian politician who served as a member of the Victorian Legislative Assembly.

== Biography ==
Born in Coventry, England, Foster emigrated to the Colony of Victoria at the age of 11. He worked as a miner and, in 1876, became a member of the mining board, working in Omeo. At the 1889 Victorian colonial election, Foster was elected to the newly created Electoral district of Gippsland East. From 1894 to 1899, Foster served as the Minister of Water Supply and the Minister of Mines in the First Turner ministry.

Foster died in Clifton Hill, triggering the 1902 Gippsland East state by-election. His wife had died two years prior, with whom he had six surviving children. The suburb of Fosterville, Victoria is named after him.
