= RBS TV (Latvia) =

Latvian commercial television

- Country: Latvia
- Broadcast area: Latvia
- Headquarters: Riga, Latvia

Programming
- Language(s): Latvian
- Picture format: 576i (4:3 SDTV)

History
- Launched: October 1994; 30 years ago
- Closed: October 1995; 29 years ago

RBS TV was the first Latvian commercial television, broadcasting in PAL standard. RBS TV was launched in 1994. "RBS TV" president was Jānis Rušenieks, but the news service was led by Kārlis Streips. RBS TV only worked for about one year. Already in April 1995 RBS TV stopped broadcasting news due to financial problems, but fully broadcasts ceased in October 1995. In 1997, RBS TV went to bankruptcy. On 23 March 2003, RBS TV was eliminated.
