= Tim Bull =

Australian politician

The Honourable Tim Bull MP
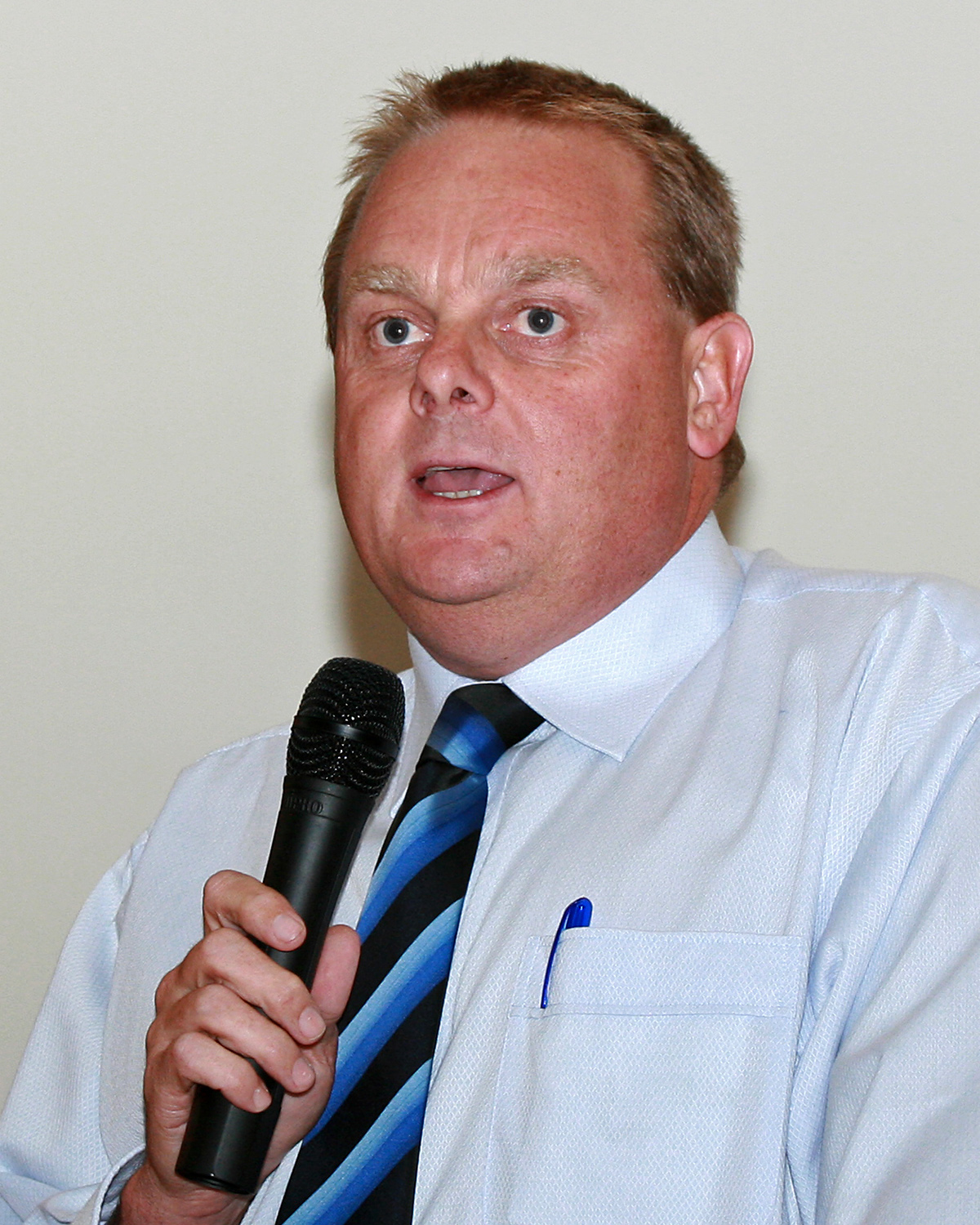
- Bull in 2010

Minister for Local Government
- In office 17 March 2014 – 4 December 2014
- Premier: Denis Napthine
- Preceded by: Jeanette Powell
- Succeeded by: Natalie Hutchins

Minister for Aboriginal Affairs
- In office 17 March 2014 – 4 December 2014
- Premier: Denis Napthine
- Preceded by: Jeanette Powell
- Succeeded by: Natalie Hutchins

Member of the Victorian Parliament for Gippsland East
- Incumbent
- Assumed office 27 November 2010
- Preceded by: Craig Ingram

Personal details
- Born: 9 December 1966 (age 59) Bairnsdale, Victoria, Australia
- Party: Nationals
- Spouse: Kim Bull
- Profession: Newspaper editor, sports program coordinator with the Australian Sports Commission
- Website: timbull.com.au

Timothy Owen Bull (born 9 December 1966) is an Australian politician. He has been a National Party member of the Victorian Legislative Assembly since 2010, representing the electorate of Gippsland East. He served as Minister for Local Government and Minister for Aboriginal Affairs in the Napthine Ministry from March to December 2014.

== Biography ==
Bull grew up in Metung, Victoria on the Gippsland Lakes where he attended Metung Primary School and then Nagle College, Bairnsdale. Bull was a newspaper editor, sports program coordinator with the Australian Sports Commission and community advocate in the area of disability services before entering parliament.

Prior to entering politics Bull was a country sportsman of note, captaining the Bairnsdale Cricket Association (BCA) team for a number of years and winning three BCA cricketer of the year titles. He also captain coached the East Gippsland Football League (EGFL) interleague team and is a 100-goal kicker in a season. He kicked twelve and ten goals in two grand finals. His interests include spending time in the outdoors with his family fishing and camping, continuing to push for better disability services in rural areas, and "having some fun" as co-host of a local community radio sports show.

== Political career ==
Bull entered Victorian politics at the 2010 Victorian State election, contesting the electorate of Gippsland East for the National Party. As part of the Coalition's election victory over John Brumby's Labor government, Bull ousted the sitting member, Independent Craig Ingram, with a 20-point two-candidate preferred swing, returning the seat to the National Party. On 17 March 2014, he was made Minister for Local Government and Minister for Aboriginal Affairs in the Napthine Ministry, replacing Jeanette Powell. He served until the defeat of the Coalition government that December.

Victorian Legislative Assembly
Preceded by Craig Ingram	Member for Gippsland East; 2010–present	Incumbent
Political offices
Preceded by Jeanette Powell	Minister for Local Government; 2014	Succeeded by Natalie Hutchins
Preceded by Jeanette Powell	Minister for Aboriginal Affairs; 2014	Succeeded by Natalie Hutchins
