= Bruce Evans (politician) =

Australian politician

Member of the Victorian Legislative Assembly for Gippsland East
- In office 15 July 1961 – 2 October 1992
- Preceded by: Sir Albert Lind
- Succeeded by: David Treasure

Personal details
- Born: 21 January 1925 Bairnsdale, Victoria, Australia
- Died: 8 November 2012 (aged 87) Richmond, Victoria, Australia
- Party: Country Party
- Spouse: Elaine Nethercote (m. 1947)
- Occupation: Dairy farmer

Military service
- Allegiance: Australia
- Branch/service: Royal Australian Air Force
- Years of service: 1943–1946
- Rank: Warrant officer

Bruce James Evans (21 January 1925 – 8 November 2012) was an Australian politician.

He was born in Bairnsdale to Joseph Evans, a farmer, and Daisy Shankly, a schoolteacher. He attended local state schools and became a bank officer for the Union Bank in 1941. In 1943 he enlisted with the Royal Australian Air Force and went on to serve in South Africa, the United Kingdom and the Middle East as a wireless air gunner. On his return in 1946 he took up dairy farming at Lindenow, and became branch president of the Returned and Services League (1947–49, 1956–57). He was active in the local dairy farming community and also in the Country Party, serving as a national, branch and district secretary. In 1961 he was elected to the Victorian Legislative Assembly as the member for Gippsland East. He was the party's deputy leader from 1964 to 1970 and its whip from 1970 until his retirement in 1992.

Victorian Legislative Assembly
Preceded by Sir Albert Lind	Member for Gippsland East; 1961–1992	Succeeded by David Treasure
