= Saïd bin Saïd Tabbara =

Bahraini-Lebanese educator (1919–2016)

- سعيد سعيد طبارة
- Born: Beirut, Lebanon
- Died: November 27, 2016; Manama, Bahrain
- Resting place: Manama Cemetery
- Education: American University of Beirut
- Occupation: educator
- Years active: 1940—2016
- Known for: pioneering Technical education in Bahrain

Saïd bin Saïd Tabbara (Arabic: سعيد سعيد طبارة, born in Beirut February 11, 1919, Lebanon, died November 27, 2016, in Manama, Bahrain) was a Bahraini-Lebanese educator.

== Early life and education ==
Tabbara was born orphaned when his merchant father died in 1918 in a Mediterranean Sea storm on return from Acre, Palestine, leaving his pregnant wife to raise six children, of which he was named after his father. His siblings were Sobhi, Wadad, Sania, Wafiqah, Hind, and Naamat.

== Educational career ==
Tabbara applied at first to work at Bahrain Petroleum Company (Bapco) but was turned down due to a lack of vacancies.With the help of a recommendation letter from his sister Wafiqah Sawaf-Nairt to the Bahraini emir’s advisor Sir Charles Belgrave, Saïd Tabbara was employed as a teacher at the technical school and arrived at the Bahrain marine airport(then in the Gudaibiya neighborhood of Manama) in 1940.

A teacher at the Manama Technical School in the Department of Machinery from 1940 to 1942, he was promoted to a senior teaching post that he held until 1944, doing most of the work of Principal Geoffrey Edward Hutchings while the latter was away on other duties. Tabbara was appointed principal of the school in 1946 to 1968, reorienting Technical education in Bahrain toward cooperation with companies such as Bapco. He helped found Jidhafs Secondary Technical School for Boys in 1969 and was appointed to a series of posts at the Ministry of Education, including director of technical and vocational education from 1968 to 1972, director of Technical education from 1972 to 1975, and assistant deputy director for general and technical education from 1975 to 1982.

== Personal life ==
Tabbara was married to Aisha Muhammad Fahmi Ibo and had the children Khaled (born 1950), Jumana(1945), Sajida(1952), and Huda (1954).

== Death ==
He died on November 27, 2016.

== Publications ==
- مهندس التعليم الصناعي في البحرين (“Industrial Engineering Education in Bahrain”) with Hussain Mohammed Al Mahrous
