= Radio Base Station =

Radio Base Station (RBS) is the commercial name given to the family of Base Stations developed by Ericsson, typically constituting a sizable part of the Radio Access Network (RAN). "Radio base station" is also the generic name to be used instead of BTS (base transceiver station) which are typically denoting GSM-era radio base station technology. For other vendors, specific equipment names are used such as Huawei DBS (Huawei DBS3900 for example. The "DBS" stands for Distributed Base Station) or NSN Flexi base stations.

== History and mmarket ==
Over the years every Mobile Telephony Base Station developed by the multinational (supported technologies range from IS136-TDMA to UMTS) has been sold with this name, although the concept of Radio Base is that of a transceiver that is primarily intended for serving as a trunked radio system Base Station for voice communication.

A popular version of this RBS base station is the RBS6000.

== Technical information ==
Depending on which kind of RBS, there are different hardware configurations.

== RBS2000 Technical information ==
A legacy version of the RBS is the RBS2000 which usually has a combination or subset of these hardware cards:

- Power Supply Unit (PSU)
- Distribution Switch Unit (DXU)
- Internal Distribution Module (IDM)
- Double Transceiver Unit (dTRU)
- Configuration Switch Unit (CXU)
- Combining and Distribution Unit (CDU)
- AC or DC Connection Unit (ACCU/DCCU)
- Fan Control Unit (FCU)
- DC filter

== RBS6000 technical information ==
RBS6000 can be used for GSM (GERAN) with DUG cards, UMTS (UTRAN) with DUW cards, and LTE (eUTRAN) with DUL/DUS cards.

The RBS site can be interconnected to the rest of the RAN with a SIU card (Site Integration Unit) which use either electrical, microwave or optical backhaul to the rest of the RAN and also provides Abis over IP connectivity for GSM base station.

RBS runs the embedded Operating System OSE from Enea from Sweden.

=== RBS hardware cards ===
The RBS6000 cabinet usually uses these cards to achieve function:

- DXB Distribution Switch Board
- DXU Distribution Switch Unit
- IXU Interface and Switching Unit
- DUG cards for GSM (GERAN) aka "Digital Unit GSM"
- DUW cards for UMTS (UTRAN)
- DUL Digital Unit cards for LTE (eUTRAN)
- DUS Digital Unit cards for combined GSM, UMTS and LTE service
- ECU Energy Control Unit
- RUG Radio Unit GSM
- RUS Radio Unit all Standards
- RRUS Remote Radio Unit all Standards
- TCB Transceiver Control Board
- BDM Battery Distribution Module
- BFU Battery Fuse Unit
- CDU Combining and Distribution Unit
- CXU Configuration Switch Unit
- FCU Fan Control Unit,
- PDU Power Distribution Unit
- PSU Power Supply Unit
- RXU Receiver Unit
- SAU Support Alarm Unit
- SCU Support Control Unit
- TMA_CM, TXU Transmitter Unit.

=== RBS operations and maintenance ===
The RBS is managed locally thanks to Ericsson software named "OMT" (Operations and Maintenance Terminal). OMT is what is usually called a LMT (Local Maintenance Terminal). A special cable is needed to connect to the serial port of the RBS with the LMT. This cable has the following simplistic pinout:

2 (DB9) ---> 3 (RJ45)
3 (DB9) ---> 2 (RJ45)
5 (DB9) ---> 1 (RJ45)

The more complete and official cable (and more complicated) has the following pinout:

5 (DB9) ---> 1 (RJ45)
3 (DB9) ---> 2 (RJ45)
2 (DB9) ---> 3 (RJ45)
8 (DB9) ---> 4 (RJ45)
7 (DB9) ---> 5 (RJ45)
4 (DB9) ---> 6+8 (RJ45)
6+1 (DB9) ---> 7 (RJ45)

== Technical information access ==
Ericsson has a policy that enforce controlling information about its RBS network element so that few people can access technical information and/or operate the RBS base station. Such attempt at controlling information dissemination used questionable DMCA take down requests on telecom industry forums for example.
