= Albert Lind =

Australian politician (1878–1964)

Sir Albert Lind
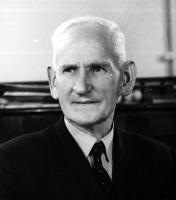

7th Deputy Premier of Victoria
- In office 14 October 1937 – 14 September 1943
- Premier: Albert Dunstan
- Preceded by: Francis Old
- Succeeded by: Bert Cremean

Member of the Victorian Legislative Assembly for Gippsland East
- In office 21 October 1920 – 1 June 1961
- Preceded by: James Cameron
- Succeeded by: Bruce Evans

Personal details
- Born: Albert Eli Lind; 21 February 1878 East Charlton, Victoria
- Died: 26 June 1964 (aged 86) Bairnsdale, Victoria, Australia
- Party: United Country Party
- Other political affiliations: Victorian Farmers' Union
- Spouse: Flora Catherine Arthur (m. 1904)
- Relations: Alan Lind (nephew)

Sir Albert Eli Lind (21 February 1878 – 26 June 1964) was an Australian politician.

== Early life ==
Lind was born in 1878 in East Charlton, Victoria, the son of Oliver Nicholas Lind, a farmer from Denmark, and his Welsh wife Mary Ann Clay. In 1882, drought forced the family to move to East Gippsland where Lind was educated at Lucknow, and then to Bairnsdale in 1884 where he attended Bairnsdale state school. By the age of 12, he was a builder's apprentice and worked in several trades. In 1904, then just married, Lind selected a 640-acre (260-hectare) property at Mount Taylor, where he established a dairy farm with his brother Ernie.

== Political career ==
Lind entered politics as a councillor for the Shire of Bairnsdale from 1914 to 1925. In October 1920, he was elected to the Victorian Legislative Assembly for the seat of Gippsland East for the Victorian Farmers' Union (VFU).

On 2 April, Lind was made Minister of Forests, Minister of Public Instruction, President of the Board of Land and Works and Commissioner of Crown Lands and Survey in Albert Dunstan's cabinet.

On 13 October 1937, Lind was voted deputy leader of the United Country Party in an unexpected ballot at the party's pre-sessional meeting, and therefore became Deputy Premier of Victoria.

When John McDonald won government in 1950, Lind resumed his portfolios of lands and forests, as well as the additional portfolio of soldier settlement.

Lind was knighted in the 1951 King's Birthday honours for his service in the Victorian Legislative Assembly.

== Family ==
Lind married Flora Catherine Arthur on 31 August 1904 at Bairnsdale. They had four sons and five daughters.

Lind was the uncle of Alan Lind, who was also a Member of the Legislative Assembly for the Labor Party, representing the districts of Mildura (1952–1955) and Dandenong (1969–1979).

Victorian Legislative Assembly
Preceded by James Cameron	Member for Gippsland East; 1920–1961	Succeeded by Bruce Evans
Political offices
Preceded by Francis Old	Deputy Premier of Victoria; 1937–1943	Succeeded by Bert Cremean
