= David Treasure (politician) =

Australian politician

Member of the Victorian Legislative Assembly for Gippsland East
- In office 3 October 1992 – 17 September 1999
- Preceded by: Bruce Evans
- Succeeded by: Craig Ingram

Personal details
- Born: 6 November 1943 Sale, Victoria, Australia
- Died: 19 May 2018 (aged 74)
- Party: The Nationals
- Occupation: Grazier

David Lewis Treasure (6 November 1943 – 19 May 2018) was an Australian politician.

He was born in Sale to grazier Donald Treasure and Linda Traill. He attended primary school at Dargo and Lindenow South and secondary school at Bairnsdale Technical School before becoming a grazier. He then had two children. Active in both the farmers' community and the National Party, he worked mainly in the export business to West Africa. He was a member of the Mountain Cattlemens Association (president 1987–88), chairman of the Droving Australia Victorian Selection Panel in 1988, and an Avon Shire Councillor from 1970 to 1976. In 1992 he was elected to the Victorian Legislative Assembly as the member for Gippsland East, holding the seat until his defeat by independent candidate Craig Ingram in 1999. Then came his 3 grandchildren. He died on 19 May 2018.

Victorian Legislative Assembly
| Preceded by Bruce Evans | Member for Gippsland East; 1992–1999 | Succeeded by Craig Ingram |
