= Orbost =

- Town
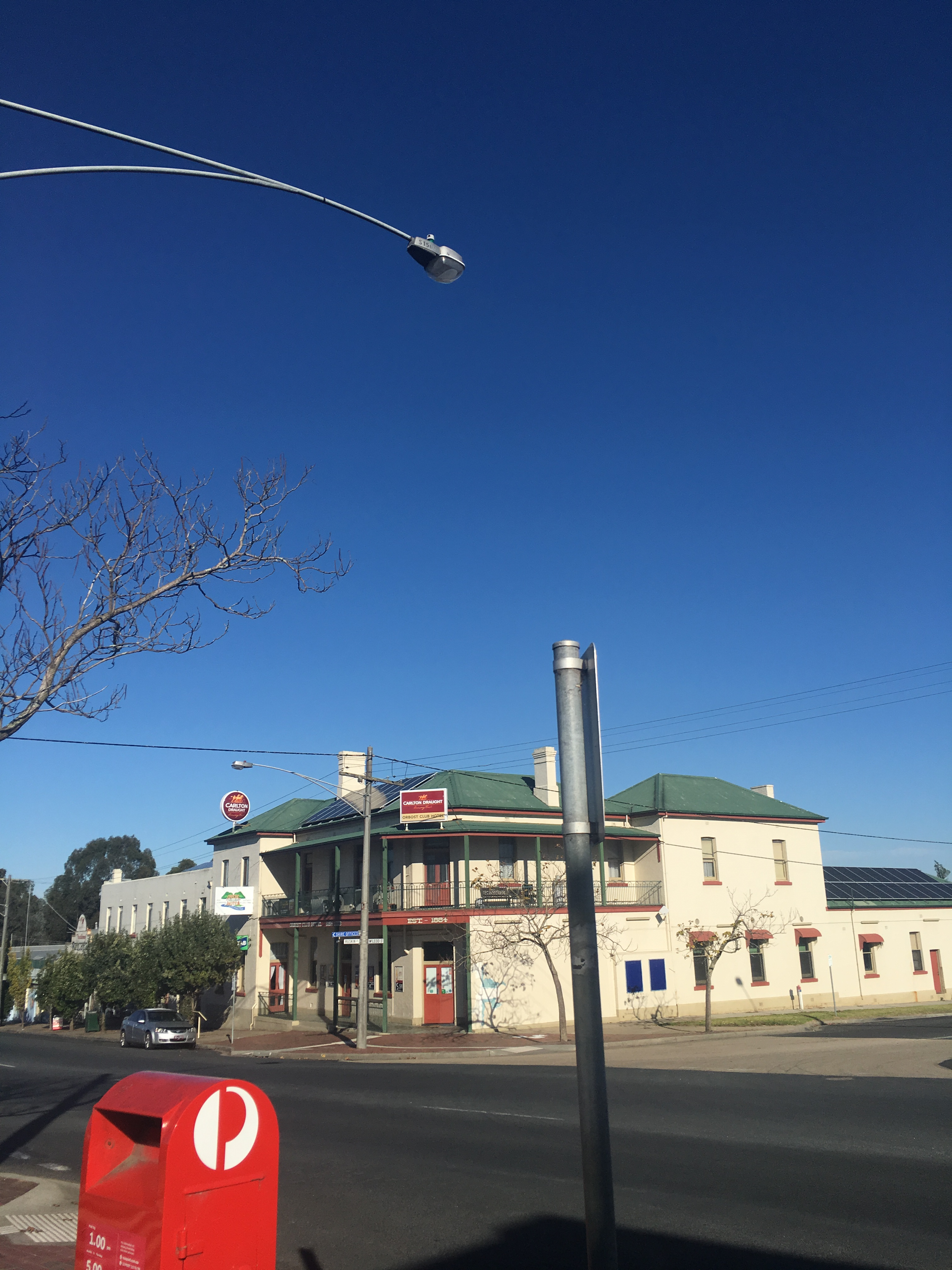
- The Orbost Club Hotel, the oldest pub in town established in 1835, also known as "The Bottom Pub" by the locals, situated at 63 Nicholson Street, Orbost.

- Interactive map of Orbost
- Coordinates: 37°42′0″S 148°27′0″E
- Country: Australia
- State: Victoria
- LGA: Shire of East Gippsland
- Location: 375 km (233 mi) E of Melbourne; 235 km (146 mi) S of Canberra; 93 km (58 mi) E of Bairnsdale; 60 km (37 mi) NE of Lakes Entrance; 217 km (135 mi) SE of Mount Hotham

Government
  - State electorate: Gippsland East
  - Federal division: Gippsland
- Elevation: 41 m (135 ft)

Population
  - Total: 2,264 (2021 census)
- Postcode: 3888
- Mean max temp: 20.4 °C (68.7 °F)
- Mean min temp: 10.1 °C (50.2 °F)
- Annual rainfall: 770.2 mm (30.32 in)

Orbost is a town in the Shire of East Gippsland, Victoria, Australia, 375 kilometres (233 mi) east of Melbourne and 235 kilometres (146 mi) south of Canberra where the Princes Highway crosses the Snowy River. It is about 16 kilometres (10 mi) from the surf and fishing seaside town of Marlo on the coast of Bass Strait and 217 km (135 mi) drive to Hotham Alpine Resort. Orbost is the service centre for the primary industries of beef, dairy cattle and sawmilling. More recently, tourism has become an important and thriving industry, being the major town close to several national parks that are between the east access to either the surf or the snow, including the famous Snowy River National Park, Alpine National Park, Errinundra National Park, Croajingolong National Park and Cape Conran Coastal Park.

The establishment of the Sailors Grave Brewery has also brought significant tourism to the area with its multiple festivals throughout the year. Cycling and canoeing have also become major tourist attractions drawing people to the area for its wide range of cycling tours and spectacular rivers throughout the region.

== History ==
The Cameron family settled on the rich alluvial river flats in 1876, followed by many other selectors, many of them Scottish migrants. Allan Burn opened the Post Office on 1 December 1880 named Neumerella (sic) and was renamed Orbost in 1883. He and wife Joyce (nee Morgan) had nine children. They owned 237 acres on the Snowy River (now Burn Rd). Allan and his brother Robert Burn arrived in Australia in 1850. Robert's descendants still live in Orbost today. A Newmerella office opened in 1889 and closed in 1897, then reopened in 1921. The township was proclaimed in 1890 and a bridge constructed across the Snowy River and a telegraph office established. Sawmills were established in the area and the first batch of sawn timber was cut at Orbost in 1882. By the late 1890s produce was regularly being exported to Melbourne via coastal trading vessels sailing up the Snowy River to Orbost. The railway from Melbourne arrived in 1916, allowing further agricultural settlement up the valley, and exploitation of native hardwood forests for timber and railway sleepers.

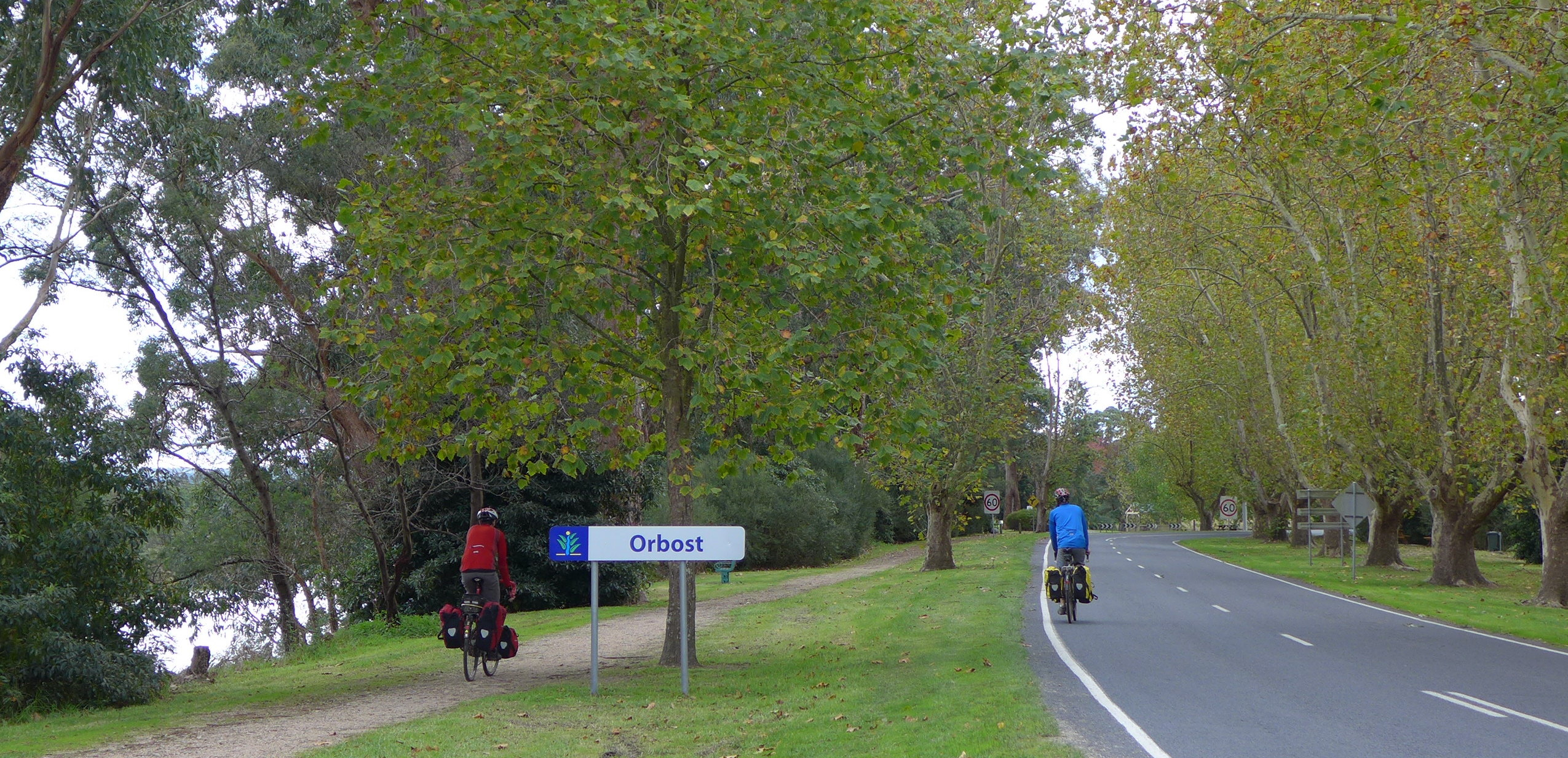
The conversion of the disused rail line to the East Gippsland Rail Trail has created a cycle tourism industry in the town.

The Gippsland railway line and surrounding townships have embarked on a campaign to "Save the Snowy River Rail Bridge."

By the 1980s, logging of East Gippsland native forests had become an environmental issue. This resulted in the creation or extension of National Parks in the area, and a steady decline in forestry and sawmilling jobs. The general rural decline of the area and its economy saw the railway close in the mid-1980s and the population drop from around 4,000 to around 2000 by the start of the 21st century.

The Snowy Mountains Scheme resulted in the waters of the Snowy River being diverted to the Murray and Murrumbidgee Rivers and associated irrigation schemes. During the 1990s the low level of water in the Snowy River was a major concern, with a political campaign to increase the flow of water from the dam at Jindabyne. Independent candidate from the Orbost district, Craig Ingram, was elected in 1999, and re-elected in 2002, to the Victorian Legislative Assembly.

The small rural communities of Bendoc, Bonang and Tubbut lie North East of Orbost. Delegate in NSW is the next major town geographically across the NSW/Vic Border from Orbost.

== Sports ==
The town is represented in the sport of Australian rules football by the Orbost-Snowy Rovers in the East Gippsland Football League.

The town's cricket teams have been successful at all levels in the Bairnsdale Cricket Association, ranging from U13s to A Grade.

The town also boasts a field hockey club which fields junior, women's and men's sides in the East Gippsland Hockey Association.

Golfers play at the course of the Orbost Golf Club on the Bonang Highway.

== Transport ==
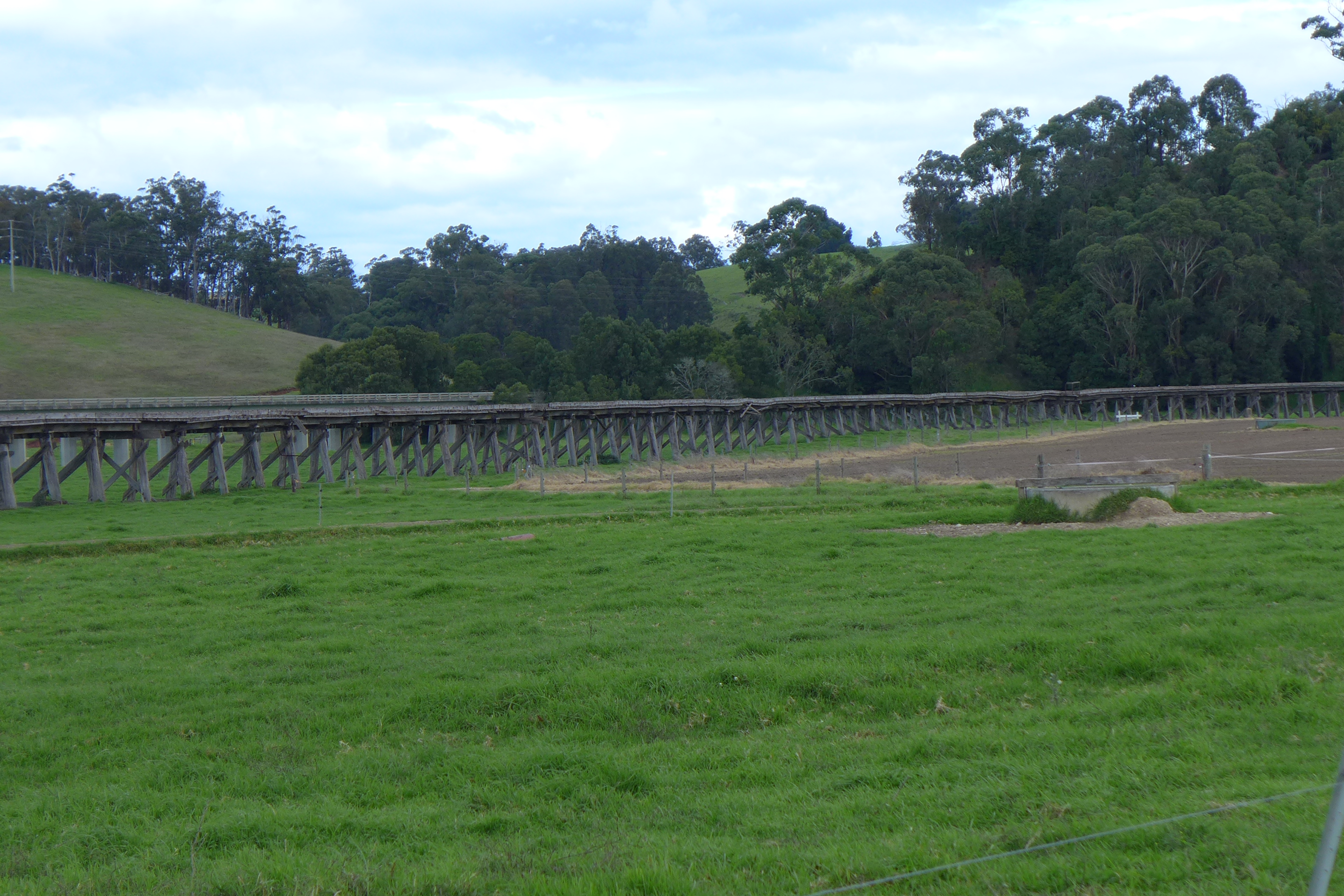
The Orbost viaduct, or also known as the Snowy Rail Bridge, once carried freight trains across the alluvial flats, stopping across the river from the centre of Orbost. The 770 metre Viaduct is an iconic structure visible from the Princes Highway and a short walk from Burn Road. The Save The Snowy Rail Bridge Community Group is actively promoting its restoration for use as a cycling and walkway as part of the East Gippsland Rail Trail.

Orbost straddles the Princes Highway. A 567 metre bridge over the Orbost floodplain opened in November 1976. The town was connected to Melbourne when the Gippsland railway line opened to Orbost station in 1916 principally carrying timber and farming produce. In the early days of the railway's operation dedicated passenger trains ran but these ceased by the 1930s. The line closed in 1987 when the line was cut back to Bairnsdale. The track infrastructure was dismantled in 1993/94. The line traversed a mixture of farmland, hills and heavily forested country. It included numerous bridges, including the Stoney Creek Trestle Bridge, the largest of its kind in Victoria. Public transport services are provided to the town by V/Line with road coach services from Batemans Bay, Marlo and Canberra to Bairnsdale that connect with train services to Melbourne.

Orbost has a regional airport, Orbost Airport YORB (RBS).

== Climate ==
Orbost has an oceanic climate with mild to warm summers and cool winters. June is the wettest month and January is the driest. The town features 73 clear days annually, much more than Melbourne's 48 days. Due to the foehn effect, winters are a few degrees warmer than Melbourne's, despite them being on the same latitude.

Climate data for Orbost (2000–2022)
Month	Jan	Feb	Mar	Apr	May	Jun	Jul	Aug	Sep	Oct	Nov	Dec	Year
Record high °C (°F)	44.5 (112.1)	45.7 (114.3)	39.0 (102.2)	35.4 (95.7)	29.4 (84.9)	23.9 (75.0)	23.0 (73.4)	26.2 (79.2)	34.6 (94.3)	35.0 (95.0)	39.8 (103.6)	43.1 (109.6)	45.7 (114.3)
Mean daily maximum °C (°F)	26.3 (79.3)	25.4 (77.7)	23.9 (75.0)	21.0 (69.8)	17.8 (64.0)	15.3 (59.5)	15.1 (59.2)	16.0 (60.8)	18.2 (64.8)	20.0 (68.0)	22.2 (72.0)	24.2 (75.6)	20.4 (68.7)
Mean daily minimum °C (°F)	14.9 (58.8)	14.6 (58.3)	13.1 (55.6)	10.8 (51.4)	8.4 (47.1)	6.4 (43.5)	5.6 (42.1)	6.0 (42.8)	7.6 (45.7)	9.2 (48.6)	11.4 (52.5)	13.0 (55.4)	10.1 (50.2)
Record low °C (°F)	6.0 (42.8)	6.2 (43.2)	5.0 (41.0)	2.9 (37.2)	1.5 (34.7)	0.3 (32.5)	−0.5 (31.1)	0.0 (32.0)	0.4 (32.7)	2.3 (36.1)	3.0 (37.4)	4.4 (39.9)	−0.5 (31.1)
Average rainfall mm (inches)	48.0 (1.89)	51.1 (2.01)	61.7 (2.43)	78.6 (3.09)	57.9 (2.28)	97.9 (3.85)	58.0 (2.28)	63.9 (2.52)	59.8 (2.35)	63.0 (2.48)	75.5 (2.97)	66.9 (2.63)	770.2 (30.32)
Average rainy days (≥ 0.2mm)	9.5	9.6	11.1	13.3	15.1	16.4	15.5	14.6	14.4	13.2	11.3	11.2	155.2
Average afternoon relative humidity (%)	57	61	58	62	65	65	63	58	59	61	61	58	61
Source: Bureau of Meteorology

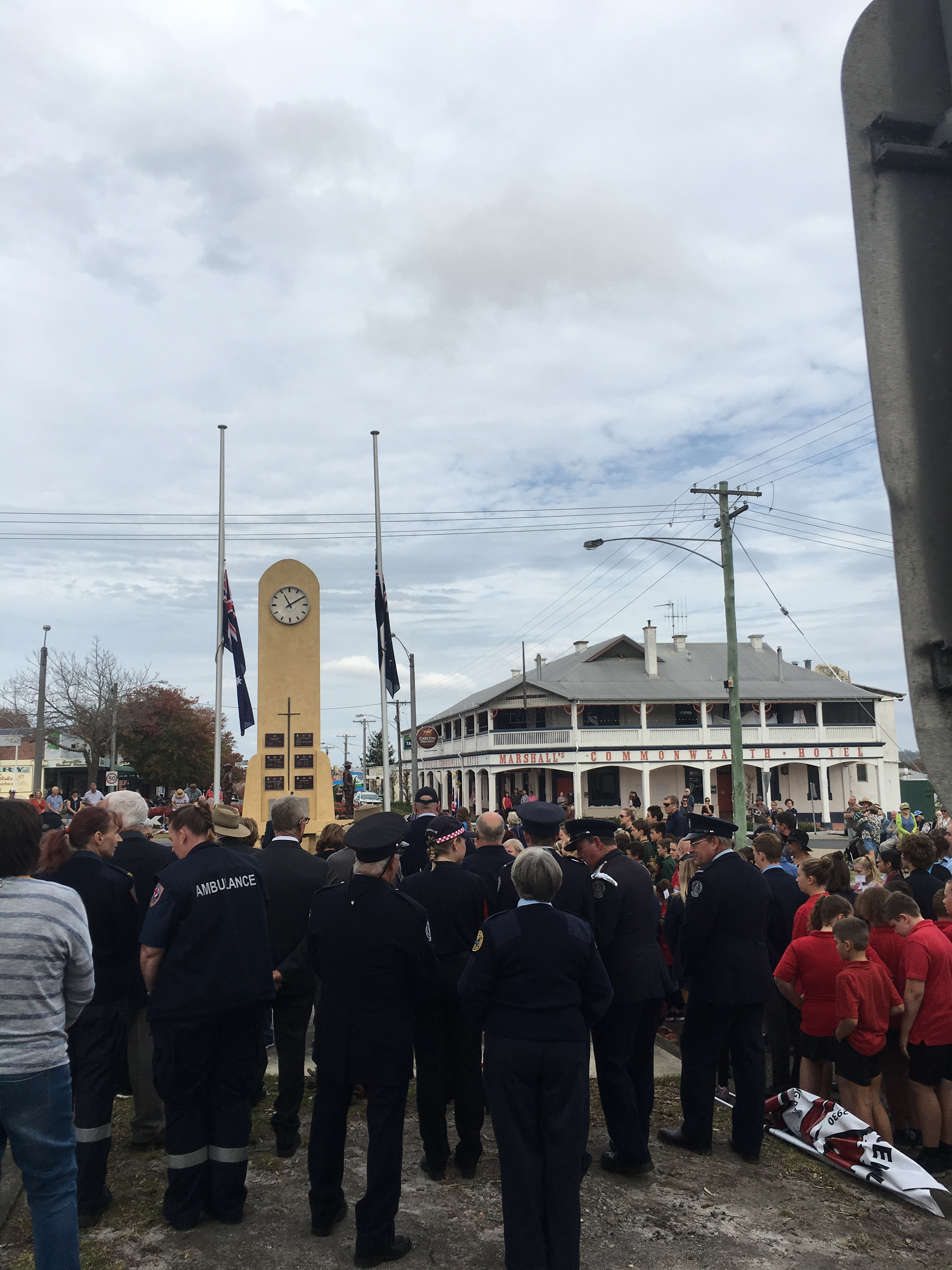
Anzac Day in Orbost, 2018

== Education ==
The Orbost region previously had four State primary schools, one Catholic primary school, and Orbost Secondary College (Government).

In 2024 Orbost Primary School, Orbost North Primary School and Orbost Secondary College merged to form the P–12 school Orbost Community College.

== Notable people ==
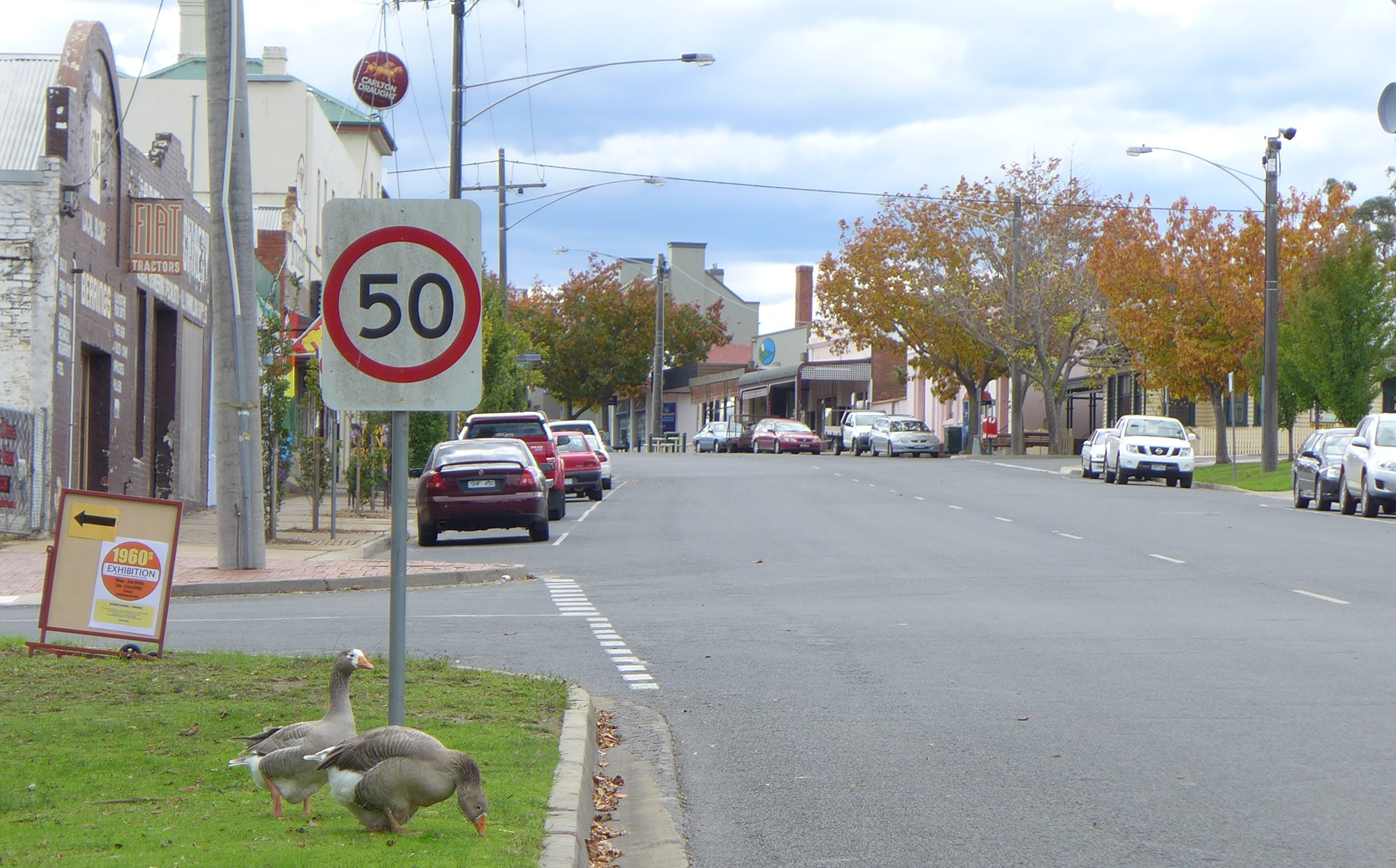
The main street of Orbost, entering from the south

- Percival Bazeley, scientist
- Jennings Carmichael (aka Grace Jennings Carmichael), poet
- Richard Dalla-Riva, politician
- Harry Firth, Australian motorsport legend. Winner of first Bathurst race in 1963.
- Jennifer Hansen, TV presenter
- Sarah Hanson-Young, politician
- Nick Heyne, former Australian rules footballer with the St Kilda Football Club
- Craig Ingram, politician
- Charlie Lynn, politician
- Tim Matthews, Paralympic athlete
- Laura Jean McKay, author
- Molly Meldrum, music critic, journalist, TV presenter
- Peter Nixon, politician
- Lindsay Tanner, politician
- Brett Voss, Former Australian Rules Footballer St Kilda Football Club
- Michael Voss, former Australian rules footballer and former coach of the Brisbane Lions in the AFL
