= Cape Conran Coastal Park =

Coastal reserve in Victoria, Australia

Coordinates: 37°46′S 148°52′E

Cape Conran Coastal Park is a coastal reserve located near Marlo in East Gippsland in Victoria, Australia. The 11,700 hectare area was declared a coastal park under the National Parks Act 1975 (Vic) in 1997. It is 420 km east of Melbourne and 530 km south of Sydney.

== Flora and fauna ==
Much of the area is covered by heathland and banksia woodland which attracts nectar-feeding birds. Dolphins and whales (depending on the time of year) may be spotted off the coast. The abundant bird life includes white-bellied sea eagles and the eastern ground parrot.

== Recreation ==
The area is used for a number of water-based activities including boating, fishing, swimming, diving and rock pooling.

Short walks within the park include the Heathland Walk, the Cape Conran Nature Trail, the East Cape Boardwalk and the Yeerung River Estuary View and Gorge trails. Day walk destinations include Dock Inlet and Pearl Point.

The Banksia Bluff Camping Area has facilities including septic toilets, cold showers, tables and fireplaces. Cabin accommodation is also provided nearby.

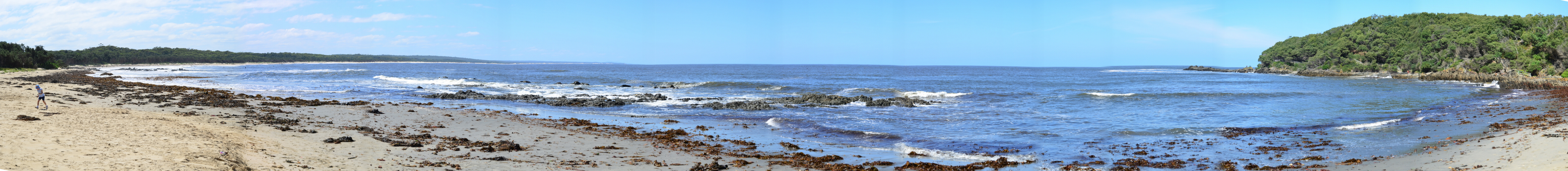
Cape Conran beach, March 2012

== See also ==
- Cape Conran
