= Marlo, Victoria =

Marlo
- Town
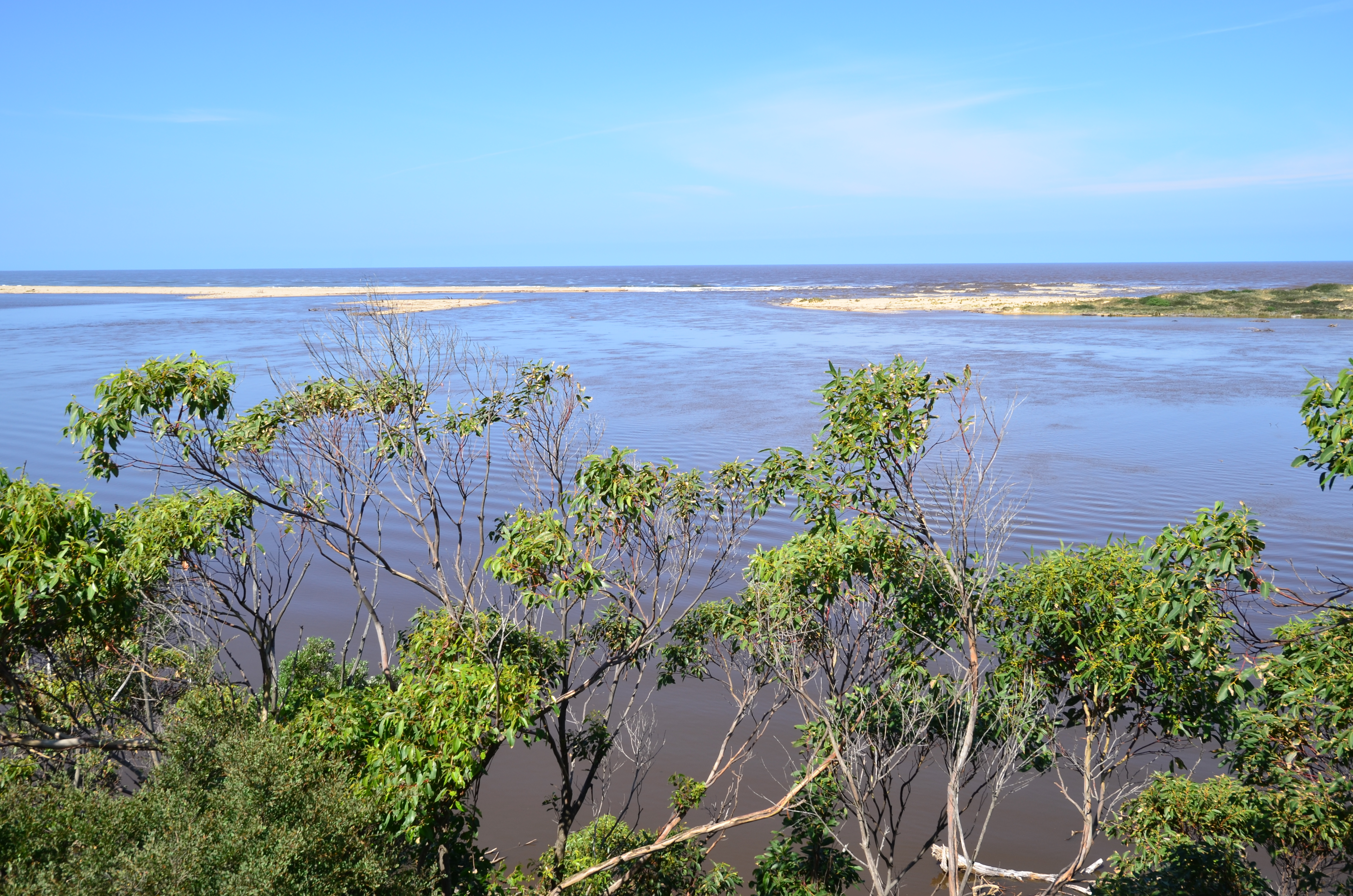
- Snowy River mouth at Marlo, in flood

- Interactive map of Marlo
- Coordinates: 37°47′S 148°31′E
- Country: Australia
- State: Victoria
- LGA: Shire of East Gippsland
- Location: 386 km (240 mi) E of Melbourne; 104 km (65 mi) E of Bairnsdale; 15 km (9.3 mi) S of Orbost

Government
  - State electorate: Electoral district of Gippsland East
  - Federal division: Division of Gippsland
- Elevation: 19 m (62 ft)

Population
  - Total: 602 (2021 census)
- Postcode: 3888

Marlo is a town in the Shire of East Gippsland, Victoria, Australia. It is located east near the mouth of the Snowy River where the Snowy River meets and flows into the Southern Ocean.

The name "Marlo" is generally accepted to have roots in tribal Aboriginal language; "Marloo" meaning white clay is suggestive of the Marlo Bluff, whilst "Murloo" meaning "muddy banks" was reportedly used by the local Indigenous people. At the 2006 census, Marlo had a population of 564.

== History ==
The first settler to occupy the Marlo township area was James Stirling around the year 1875. He built a bark hut on the bluff that had two rooms, bark walls, earthen floors and a shingle roof. By 1884, this structure had expanded to a 9 roomed accommodation house and in 1886 became the Marlo Hotel when a liquor license was granted.

The Governor-in-Council declared Marlo to be a township on 18 February 1889. During May 1889, the government surveyor, E.L. Bruce set out 19 sections of the new township, with the first sales of subdivided land occurring the following May.

At this time, Stirling's Marlo Hotel was the unofficial hub for the community. It was a general store, accommodation house and the unofficial post office, with settlers taking turns in bringing the mail from Orbost or Cunningham. This continued until Aug 1942, and in 1969 was located in a house adjacent to the Marlo Hotel, before being transferred to the Marlo General Store in this year. The official Post Office List states the Marlo Post Office opened around 1902.

Notable years in Marlo's History:

- 1845-1874 Norman McLeod holds the land around Marlo
- 1854 Charles Petersen employs 40 men to strip wattle bark along the Snowy River for tanneries in Europe
- 1875 James Stirling occupies land at the Marlo Bluff
- 1880 Snowy River Shipping Company formed
- 1880 Marlo's population is 30 residents
- 1884 James Stirling's Marlo Accommodation House
- 1886 James Stirling's Marlo Hotel
- 1889 The "Neptune" wrecked at Pearl Point with Martin Jorgenson
- 1889 Marlo declared a township
- 1890 First Marlo land sales adjacent to Jorgenson St
- 1891 Samuel Richardson builds the Curlip paddle steamer
- 1893 First telephone installed at Marlo Hotel
- 1894 Duncan Cameron's Marlo Hotel
- 1895 The "Ridge Park" wrecked on Beware Reef
- 1900 Unofficial school taught by Miss Mulfahey
- 1902 Marlo State School 3433 opened
- 1906 Gluth's Marlo Hotel
- 1906 Marlo's first bridge completed
- 1907 Sir Reginald Talbot visits Marlo
- 1907 Marlo Cemetery Gazetted
- 1908 Stewart's Marlo Hotel
- 1908 Experimental farm developed on Marlo Plains
- 1910 Post Office at Stirling residence in Willis Ave
- 1914 Marlo Race Course Gazetted as temporary recreation reserve
- 1915 Shipping ceases in Port of Marlo
- 1916 Marlo Estate land sales along Willis Ave and Old Marlo Rd
- 1921 Gas light beacon flashing every 11 secs replaces kerosene
- 1925 Walter Rice builds a general store
- 1925 Post Office at Marlo Hotel
- 1926 First tour bus arrives in Marlo
- 1927 Seagull flying boat lands in estuary
- 1930 Walter Rice builds the "Ozone Picture Theatre"
- 1933 Marlo State School goes into recess
- 1936 Marlo State School reopened
- 1937 Land extension sales from Jorgenson St
- 1940 Marlo State School goes into recess
- 1942 Post office leaves Marlo Hotel
- 1946 Marlo State School reopened
- 1946-1947 Marlo Rural Fire Brigade formed
- 1946 Cape Conran Houses erected
- 1950 Snowy River Boat Club formed (power boats)
- 1950 Marlo Aerodrome land reserved
- 1950 Hall built at Cape Conran
- 1952 Marlo State School located in Jorgenson St
- 1954 Marlo Race Course Gazetted
- 1956-1960 Land extension sales north from Jorgenson St
- 1958-1961 Marlo Bridge built by J.C. Hourigan of Traralgon
- 1958 Marlo Tennis Club formed
- 1963 Electric light beacon flashing every 6 secs replaces gas
- 1965 Marlo Tennis Courts laid down in Jorgenson St
- 1965 Marlo Aerodrome opened
- 1967 Marlo Tennis Club Rooms built
- 1969 Post Office operates from Marlo General Store
- 1969 Electric power connected to Cape Conran
- 1970 Electric beacon moved to lighthouse reserve
- 1970 Mains water supplied from Rocky River
- 1971 First night flight into Marlo aerodrome
- 1972 Snowy River Boat Club goes into recess (power boats)
- 1972 Brick CFA building erected
- 1973 Moderate wildfire burned from Marlo to Cape Conran
- 1974 Automatic telephone exchange installed
- 1974 Marlo Boat Rescue Club formed
- 1977 Snowy River Boat Club emerges from recess
- 1981 Marlo's first take away food store
- 1981-1982 West Cape Boat ramp constructed
- 1982 CFA building extended
- 1982 Marlo Boat Rescue Club Shed on Jorgenson St built by Orbost Secondary College students

Street Name Derivations: Most street names were derived from the families that lived there or notable Marlo identities of the time.

- Argyle Pde - Named for Sir Stanley Argyle who often fished Marlo in his boat, "Mascot"
- Brodribb Dr - After the Brodribb River, which itself was named after an early settler. A Patterson subdivision.
- Conlon Rd - Named for the Conlon family, landholders at Marlo Plains adjacent to Point Ricardo
- Conran Crt - Named after Cape Conran. Originally a Fatchen subdivision.
- Duncan St - Named for Duncan Cameron, early settler and licensee of the Marlo Hotel
- Foreshore Rd - runs adjacent to the estuary foreshore
- Harding Crt -
- Healeys Rd - Possibly named for the Healey family who farmed the area
- Holy Nelly Ln - So named for a prominent local resident and hotel licensee who often proclaimed 'Holy Nelly' and lived in the lane
- Jorgenson St - Named for Martin Jorgenson, early settler after being wrecked at Pearl Point. He also kept the "Ricardo Guest House" that operated opposite the Marlo Hotel and is still in the family.
- Mills St - After a captain of one of the early trading vessels
- Mots Beach Av - Named after Mots Beach. Local belief is that it may stem from the acronym Mouth Of The Snowy. Originally a Fatchen subdivision.
- Perry St - After Henry Perry, longtime resident and descendant of early Orbost settler
- Ricardo Dr - Named for Point Ricardo. This drive was originally a Fatchen subdivision and the road this family lived on
- Rodwell St - Named for the settler family that owned property adjacent to it
- Saleni Dr -
- Sampson's Lookout/St - After Mrs Sampson, a wealthy dentist and keen angler who fished around this area
- Stewart St - Named for the licensees of the Marlo Hotel
- Stirling St - Named for James Stirling and said to be the site of his home
- Towner St - Named for the early settlers who lived near the corner of Argyle Pde and Foreshore Rd opposite the Marlo Hotel. This house was said to be one of the first built in Marlo
- Wakefield St - After Norman Wakefield, a Victorian naturalist and son of an Orbost saddler
- Ward St - After Roy Ward
- William Crt - Originally an Eddlington subdivision
- William Hunter Dr - Originally a Fatchen subdivision
- Willis Ave - Said to be named after a city jeweller who called his home "Marlo". Willis was the name of one of the persons associated with the syndicate that bought, subdivided and sold Stirling's property around the Old Marlo Rd in 1915.
