= Craig Ingram =

Australian politician

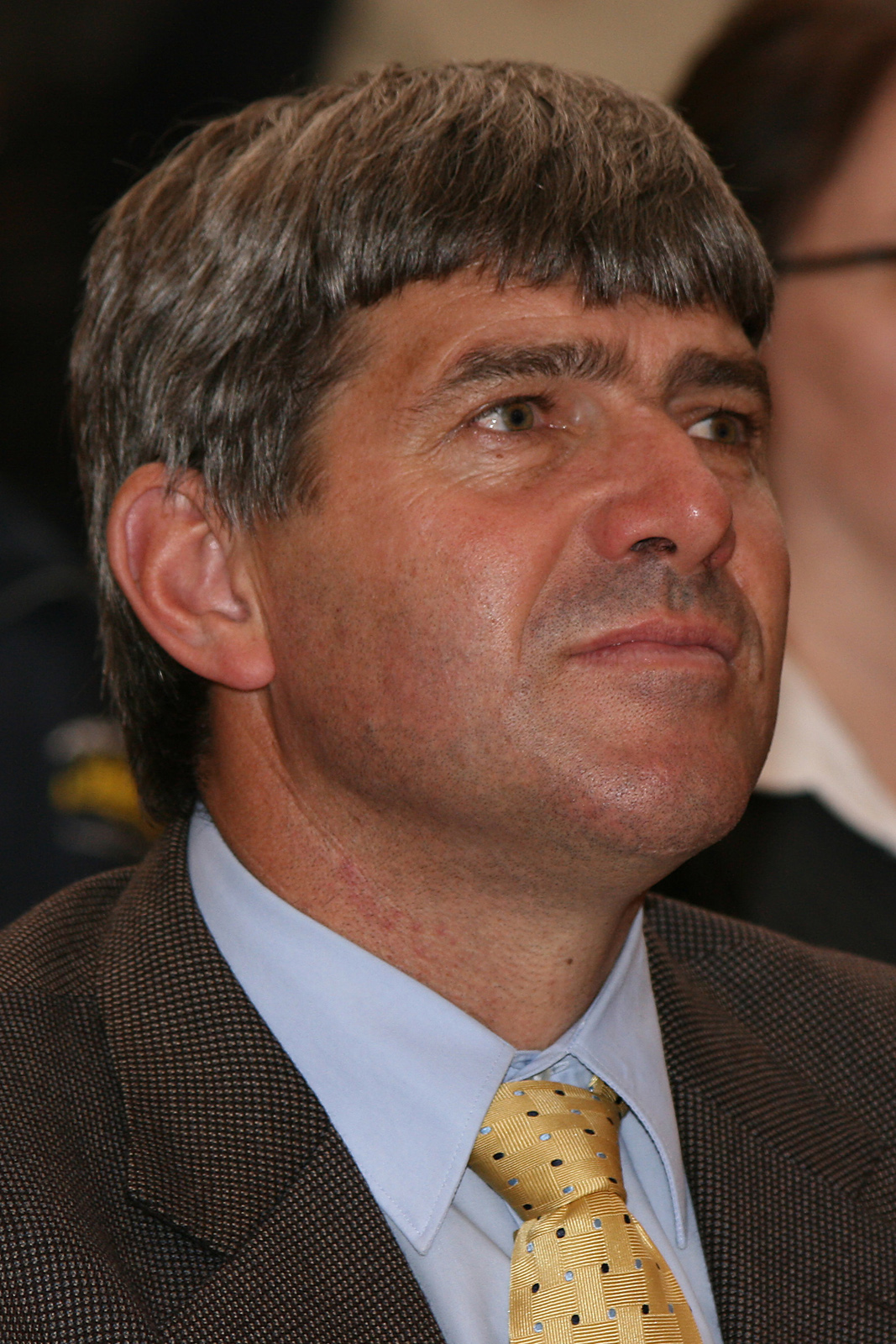

Member of the Victorian Legislative Assembly for Gippsland East
- In office 18 September 1999 – 26 November 2010
- Preceded by: David Treasure
- Succeeded by: Tim Bull

Personal details
- Born: 25 March 1965 (age 61) Orbost, Victoria, Australia
- Party: Independent
- Profession: Farmer, abalone diver

Craig Ingram (born 25 March 1965) is a former Australian politician, and was the Independent Member of Parliament for Gippsland East in the Victorian Legislative Assembly from 1999 to 2010. In 2012 he was appointed as executive officer for the Amateur Fisherman's Association of the NT (AFANT).

== Personal life ==
Ingram was educated at Mallacoota P-12 College from 1970 to 1981, and undertook a Certificate of Technical Fisheries at the Australian Maritime College in 1987. Prior to being elected to parliament, Ingram worked as a farmer from 1987 to 1989, and as an abalone diver from 1989 to 1999. Ingram is married and has 6 children from 2 separate marriages.

== Political career ==
At the 1999 election, he unexpectedly won the seat after receiving preferences from the independent, One Nation and Labor candidates. Ingram then held the balance of power with two other independents, Russell Savage and Susan Davies. The three independents would not support a minority government led by the incumbent Liberal Premier Jeff Kennett and decided instead to support a minority Labor government under Steve Bracks. This led to Kennett's decision to quit not only the premiership but politics altogether.

At the 2002 election, Ingram was easily re-elected, polling 41% of the primary vote and 62% of the two candidate preferred vote. At the 2006 election, Ingram won with a slightly reduced primary vote of 38%, and 53% of the two candidate preferred vote.

Ingram came under heavy criticism in mid-2007 when he failed to return from holiday to his electorate which had suffered devastating floods.

Ingram was defeated in the 2010 Election as John Brumby's Labor government was removed from office, and the Coalition regained power across Victoria. Gippsland East was returned to National Party hands, when their new candidate, Tim Bull, gained a very large swing. Ingram received only 25.31% of the primary vote, and 37.94% of the two-party preferred vote.

Victorian Legislative Assembly
Preceded by David Treasure	Member for Gippsland East; 1999–2010	Succeeded by Tim Bull
