= Electoral district of Gippsland East =

State electoral district of Victoria, Australia

Gippsland East Victoria—Legislative Assembly
- Interactive map of electoral district boundaries from the 2022 state election
- State: Victoria
- Created: 1889
- MP: Tim Bull
- Party: National Party
- Namesake: East Gippsland
- Electors: 46,335 (2018)
- Area: 27,544 km^{2} (10,634.8 sq mi)
- Demographic: Rural
Electorates around Gippsland East:
Ovens Valley	Benambra	New South Wales
Eildon; Narracan	Gippsland East	Tasman Sea
Gippsland South	Tasman Sea	Tasman Sea

The electoral district of Gippsland East is an electoral district of the Victorian Legislative Assembly. It covers most of eastern Victoria and includes the towns of Bairnsdale, Lakes Entrance, Orbost, Omeo, Maffra and Heyfield. Gippsland East is the state's third largest electorate in area and covers 27,544 square kilometres.

The Country Party (now the National Party) held the seat without interruption from 1920 to 1999. However at the 1999 election independent candidate Craig Ingram unexpectedly won the seat after receiving preferences from the independent, One Nation and Labor candidates.

Ingram's victory affected state politics—Ingram and fellow Independents Susan Davies and Russell Savage contributed to the end of the Kennett era by agreeing to back Labor to form government after the 1999 election. Ingram was also returned in the 2002 and 2006 elections. He was defeated in 2010 by National candidate Tim Bull.

== Members for Gippsland East ==
Member	Party	Term
Henry Foster	Unaligned	1889–1902
James Cameron	Ministerialist	1902–1920
James Cameron	Commonwealth Liberal	1902–1920
James Cameron	Nationalist	1902–1920
Sir Albert Lind	Farmers Union	1920–1961
Sir Albert Lind	Country	1920–1961
Bruce Evans	Country	1961–1975
Bruce Evans	National Country	1975–1982
Bruce Evans	National	1982–1992
David Treasure	National	1992–1999
Craig Ingram	Independent	1999–2010
Tim Bull	National	2010–present

== Election results ==
2022 Victorian state election: Gippsland East
Party	Candidate	Votes	%	±%
National	Tim Bull	26,737	63.3	+6.6
Labor	Stephen Richardson	7,191	17.0	−4.7
Greens	Nissa Ling	2,691	6.4	+0.2
Shooters, Fishers, Farmers	Ricky Muir	2,460	5.8	+5.8
Freedom	Ed Barnes	1,340	3.2	+3.2
Family First	Carl John Fechner	1,068	2.5	+2.5
Animal Justice	Sally Court	725	1.7	+1.7
Total formal votes		42,209	95.5	+1.2
Informal votes		1,995	4.5	−1.2
Turnout		44,204	89.0	+1.3
Two-party-preferred result
National	Tim Bull	31,475	74.6	+7.0
Labor	Stephen Richardson	10,734	25.4	−7.0
National hold		Swing	+7.0	

== List of towns in Gippsland East ==
Bairnsdale, Boisdale, Briagolong, Bruthen, Buchan, Cann River, Dargo, Ensay, Heyfield, Lakes Entrance, Lindenow, Maffra, Mallacoota, Metung, Newry, Nowa Nowa, Omeo, Orbost, Paynesville, Raymond Island, Stratford, Swan Reach, Swifts Creek and Wy Yung.
