= Electoral results for the district of Caulfield =

Victoria, Australia, district election results

This is a list of electoral results for the Electoral district of Caulfield in Victorian state elections.

== Members for Caulfield ==
Member	Party	Term
Frederick Forrest	Progressive Liberal	1927–1930
Harold Daniel Luxton	United Australia	1930–1935
Harold Cohen	United Australia	1935–1943
Andrew Hughes	Independent Socialist	1943–1945
Alexander Dennett	Liberal	1945–1952
Alexander Dennett	Electoral Reform	1952–1955
Joe Rafferty	Liberal	1955–1958
Alexander Fraser	Liberal	1958–1965
Ian McLaren	Liberal	1965–1967
Edgar Tanner	Liberal	1967–1976
Charles Francis	Liberal	1976–1977
Charles Francis	Independent Liberal	1977–1979
Ted Tanner	Liberal	1979–1996
Helen Shardey	Liberal	1996–2010
David Southwick	Liberal	2010–present

== Election results ==
=== Elections in the 2020s ===
2022 Victorian state election: Caulfield
Party	Candidate	Votes	%	±%
Liberal	David Southwick	18,088	44.5	−1.6
Labor	Lior Harel	11,301	27.8	−6.2
Greens	Rachel Iampolski	6,447	15.8	+1.1
Independent	Nomi Kaltmann	2,643	6.5	+6.5
Animal Justice	Asher Myerson	908	2.2	−0.8
Liberal Democrats	Michael Abelman	739	1.8	+1.8
Family First	Lynne Edwell	557	1.4	+1.4
Total formal votes		40,683	96.7	+1.1
Informal votes		1,374	3.3	−1.1
Turnout		42,057	86.7	−1.4
Two-party-preferred result
Liberal	David Southwick	21,183	52.1	+2.0
Labor	Lior Harel	19,500	47.9	−2.0
Liberal hold		Swing	+2.0	

=== Elections in the 2010s ===
2018 Victorian state election: Caulfield
Party	Candidate	Votes	%	±%
Liberal	David Southwick	17,861	46.85	−4.84
Labor	Sorina Grasso	13,054	34.24	+4.51
Greens	Dinesh Mathew	5,387	14.13	−2.15
Animal Justice	Troy Evans	1,153	3.02	+3.02
Sustainable Australia	Aviya Bavati	665	1.74	+1.74
Total formal votes		38,120	95.65	−0.18
Informal votes		1,735	4.35	+0.18
Turnout		39,855	88.13	−2.53
Two-party-preferred result
Liberal	David Southwick	19,162	50.27	−4.61
Labor	Sorina Grasso	18,958	49.73	+4.61
Liberal hold		Swing	−4.61	

2014 Victorian state election: Caulfield
Party	Candidate	Votes	%	±%
Liberal	David Southwick	18,860	51.7	−4.0
Labor	Josh Burns	10,849	29.7	+5.0
Greens	Tim Baxter	5,940	16.3	−0.4
Independent	John Myers	488	1.3	+1.3
Rise Up Australia	Teresa Horvath	345	0.9	+0.9
Total formal votes		36,482	95.8	−0.6
Informal votes		1,589	4.2	+0.6
Turnout		38,071	90.7	−1.5
Two-party-preferred result
Liberal	David Southwick	20,034	54.9	−4.9
Labor	Josh Burns	16,471	45.1	+4.9
Liberal hold		Swing	−4.9	

2010 Victorian state election: Caulfield
Party	Candidate	Votes	%	±%
Liberal	David Southwick	19,018	57.75	+3.77
Labor	Heather Abramson	7,729	23.47	−5.46
Greens	Phillip Walker	5,307	16.11	+0.85
Family First	Eric Labonne	490	1.49	−0.03
Independent	Daniel Sapphire	227	0.69	+0.69
Independent	Peter Brohier	163	0.49	+0.49
Total formal votes		32,934	96.42	+0.08
Informal votes		1,223	3.58	−0.08
Turnout		34,157	90.62	−0.29
Two-party-preferred result
Liberal	David Southwick	20,267	61.53	+3.90
Labor	Heather Abramson	12,672	38.47	−3.90
Liberal hold		Swing	+3.90	

=== Elections in the 2000s ===
2006 Victorian state election: Caulfield
Party	Candidate	Votes	%	±%
Liberal	Helen Shardey	17,253	53.98	+4.91
Labor	Steve Cusworth	9,343	29.23	−5.79
Greens	Peter Job	4,878	15.26	−0.65
Family First	Eric Labonne	485	1.52	+1.52
Total formal votes		31,959	96.34	−0.37
Informal votes		1,215	3.66	+0.37
Turnout		33,174	90.91	+0.34
Two-party-preferred result
Liberal	Helen Shardey	18,400	57.63	+5.30
Labor	Steve Cusworth	13,526	42.37	−5.30
Liberal hold		Swing	+5.30	

2002 Victorian state election: Caulfield
Party	Candidate	Votes	%	±%
Liberal	Helen Shardey	15,608	49.1	−8.9
Labor	Harry Simon	11,138	35.0	−6.1
Greens	Ronen Becker	5,061	15.9	+15.2
Total formal votes		31,807	96.7	−0.2
Informal votes		1,082	3.3	+0.2
Turnout		32,889	90.6	
Two-party-preferred result
Liberal	Helen Shardey	16,620	52.3	−5.9
Labor	Harry Simon	15,187	47.7	+5.9
Liberal hold		Swing	−5.9	

=== Elections in the 1990s ===
1999 Victorian state election: Caulfield
Party	Candidate	Votes	%	±%
Liberal	Helen Shardey	18,947	58.5	−0.8
Labor	Harry Simon	13,460	41.5	+0.8
Total formal votes		32,407	96.9	−0.7
Informal votes		1,024	3.1	+0.7
Turnout		33,431	88.9	
Liberal hold		Swing	−0.8	

1996 Victorian state election: Caulfield
Party	Candidate	Votes	%	±%
Liberal	Helen Shardey	18,995	58.3	−5.7
Labor	Tony Williams	12,575	38.6	+2.5
Natural Law	Suzi Arnold	1,028	3.2	+3.2
Total formal votes		32,598	97.7	+1.9
Informal votes		781	2.3	−1.9
Turnout		33,379	91.6	
Two-party-preferred result
Liberal	Helen Shardey	19,306	59.3	−4.6
Labor	Tony Williams	13,264	40.7	+4.6
Liberal hold		Swing	−4.6	

1992 Victorian state election: Caulfield
Party	Candidate	Votes	%	±%
Liberal	Ted Tanner	19,842	63.9	+9.8
Labor	Valerie Nicholls	11,194	36.1	−9.8
Total formal votes		31,036	95.8	+0.4
Informal votes		1,365	4.2	−0.4
Turnout		32,401	93.1	
Liberal hold		Swing	+9.8	

=== Elections in the 1980s ===
1988 Victorian state election: Caulfield
Party	Candidate	Votes	%	±%
Liberal	Ted Tanner	13,531	55.10	−2.19
Labor	David Jackson	11,026	44.90	+2.19
Total formal votes		24,557	95.21	−1.64
Informal votes		1,235	4.79	+1.64
Turnout		25,792	89.30	−1.29
Liberal hold		Swing	−2.19	

1985 Victorian state election: Caulfield
Party	Candidate	Votes	%	±%
Liberal	Ted Tanner	15,460	57.3	+8.6
Labor	Jack Diamond	11,527	42.7	−0.5
Total formal votes		26,987	96.8	
Informal votes		877	3.2	
Turnout		27,864	90.6	
Liberal hold		Swing	+4.1	

1982 Victorian state election: Caulfield
Party	Candidate	Votes	%	±%
Liberal	Ted Tanner	12,909	53.5	+13.3
Labor	Jack Diamond	9,221	38.2	+7.6
Democrats	Beverley Broadbent	2,017	8.4	−2.2
Total formal votes		24,147	97.3	+0.6
Informal votes		640	2.7	−0.6
Turnout		24,787	91.9	+2.1
Two-party-preferred result
Liberal	Ted Tanner	13,766	57.0	+3.2
Labor	Jack Diamond	10,381	43.0	−3.2
Liberal hold		Swing	+3.2	

=== Elections in the 1970s ===
1979 Victorian state election: Caulfield
Party	Candidate	Votes	%	±%
Liberal	Ted Tanner	9,752	40.2	−20.6
Labor	Gilbert Wright	7,419	30.6	−3.6
Independent	Charles Francis	4,510	18.6	+18.6
Democrats	Allan Blankfield	2,573	10.6	+10.6
Total formal votes		24,254	96.7	−0.2
Informal votes		834	3.3	+0.2
Turnout		25,088	89.8	+0.7
Two-party-preferred result
Liberal	Ted Tanner	13,043	53.8	−11.5
Labor	Gilbert Wright	11,211	46.2	+11.5
Liberal hold		Swing	−11.5	

1976 Victorian state election: Caulfield
Party	Candidate	Votes	%	±%
Liberal	Charles Francis	15,851	60.8	+6.3
Labor	Gilbert Wright	8,930	34.2	−4.0
Democratic Labor	Mary Lane	1,300	5.0	−1.3
Total formal votes		26,081	96.9	
Informal votes		821	3.1	
Turnout		26,902	89.1	
Two-party-preferred result
Liberal	Charles Francis	17,021	65.3	+4.7
Labor	Gilbert Wright	9,060	34.7	−4.7
Liberal hold		Swing	+4.7	

1973 Victorian state election: Caulfield
Party	Candidate	Votes	%	±%
Liberal	Edgar Tanner	14,236	55.1	+6.7
Labor	John Graham	10,096	39.1	+7.5
Democratic Labor	Peter Grant	1,504	5.8	−6.5
Total formal votes		25,836	96.8	+0.9
Informal votes		843	3.2	−0.9
Turnout		26,679	90.9	−0.6
Two-party-preferred result
Liberal	Edgar Tanner	15,515	60.0	−2.9
Labor	John Graham	10,321	40.0	+2.9
Liberal hold		Swing	−2.9	

1970 Victorian state election: Caulfield
Party	Candidate	Votes	%	±%
Liberal	Edgar Tanner	11,334	48.4	−2.5
Labor	George Papadopoulos	7,394	31.6	−2.3
Democratic Labor	Peter Grant	2,872	12.3	−2.9
Independent	Evelyn Janover	1,827	7.8	+7.8
Total formal votes		23,427	95.9	−0.5
Informal votes		1,006	4.1	+0.5
Turnout		24,433	91.5	−0.4
Two-party-preferred result
Liberal	Edgar Tanner	14,738	62.9	−0.9
Labor	George Papadopoulos	8,689	37.1	+0.9
Liberal hold		Swing	−0.9	

=== Elections in the 1960s ===
1967 Victorian state election: Caulfield
Party	Candidate	Votes	%	±%
Liberal	Edgar Tanner	11,834	50.9	−2.4
Labor	Bob Hogg	7,885	33.9	−0.4
Democratic Labor	Peter Grant	3,542	15.2	+3.6
Total formal votes		23,261	96.4	
Informal votes		870	3.6	
Turnout		24,131	91.9	
Two-party-preferred result
Liberal	Edgar Tanner	14,845	63.8	+0.1
Labor	Bob Hogg	8,416	36.2	−0.1
Liberal hold		Swing	+0.1	

1965 Caulfield state by-election
Party	Candidate	Votes	%	±%
Liberal and Country	Ian McLaren	10,686	64.9	+7.8
Labor	Robert Vernon	5,784	35.1	+5.5
Total formal votes		16,460	98.7	+0.4
Informal votes		222	1.3	−0.4
Turnout		16,692	78.8	−14.0
Liberal and Country hold		Swing	−3.5	

1964 Victorian state election: Caulfield
Party	Candidate	Votes	%	±%
Liberal and Country	Alexander Fraser	11,093	57.1	+1.8
Labor	Robert Vernon	5,760	29.6	+3.0
Democratic Labor	Celia Laird	2,584	13.3	−4.7
Total formal votes		19,437	98.3	+0.4
Informal votes		336	1.7	−0.4
Turnout		19,773	92.8	+0.9
Two-party-preferred result
Liberal and Country	Alexander Fraser	13,290	68.4	−2.3
Labor	Robert Vernon	6,147	31.6	+2.3
Liberal and Country hold		Swing	−2.3	

1961 Victorian state election: Caulfield
Party	Candidate	Votes	%	±%
Liberal and Country	Alexander Fraser	10,676	55.3	−3.9
Labor	Sydney Edwards	5,137	26.6	−1.0
Democratic Labor	Walter Culliford	3,474	18.0	+4.8
Total formal votes		19,287	97.9	−0.6
Informal votes		410	2.1	+0.6
Turnout		19,697	91.9	−0.5
Two-party-preferred result
Liberal and Country	Alexander Fraser	13,629	70.7	+0.2
Labor	Sydney Edwards	5,658	29.3	−0.2
Liberal and Country hold		Swing	+0.2	

=== Elections in the 1950s ===
1958 Victorian state election: Caulfield
Party	Candidate	Votes	%	±%
Liberal and Country	Alexander Fraser	11,802	59.2	
Labor	Alan Brenton	5,501	27.6	
Democratic Labor	Cecily Laird	2,641	13.2	
Total formal votes		19,944	98.5	
Informal votes		312	1.5	
Turnout		20,256	92.4	
Two-party-preferred result
Liberal and Country	Alexander Fraser	14,047	70.5	
Labor	Alan Brenton	5,897	29.5	
Liberal and Country hold		Swing		

1955 Victorian state election: Caulfield
Party	Candidate	Votes	%	±%
Liberal and Country	Joe Rafferty	8,505	54.4	
Victorian Liberal	Alexander Dennett	7,133	45.6	
Total formal votes		15,638	94.6	
Informal votes		900	5.4	
Turnout		16,538	90.8	
Liberal and Country gain from Victorian Liberal		Swing		

1952 Victorian state election: Caulfield
Party	Candidate	Votes	%	±%
Electoral Reform	Alexander Dennett	12,492	62.6	+62.6
Independent	Robert Flanagan	7,273	37.4	+37.4
Total formal votes		19,965	97.8	−1.3
Informal votes		443	2.2	+1.3
Turnout		20,408	91.6	−0.1
Electoral Reform gain from Liberal and Country		Swing	N/A	

1950 Victorian state election: Caulfield
Party	Candidate	Votes	%	±%
Liberal and Country	Alexander Dennett	13,816	63.9	−36.1
Labor	Daniel Elliston	7,814	36.1	+36.1
Total formal votes		21,630	99.1	
Informal votes		190	0.9	
Turnout		21,820	91.7	
Liberal and Country hold		Swing	N/A	

=== Elections in the 1940s ===
1947 Victorian state election: Caulfield
Party	Candidate	Votes	%	±%
Liberal	Alexander Dennett	unopposed		
Liberal hold		Swing		

1945 Victorian state election: Caulfield
Party	Candidate	Votes	%	±%
Liberal	Alexander Dennett	12,408	58.2	
Independent	Andrew Hughes	8,925	41.8	
Total formal votes		21,333	98.1	
Informal votes		415	1.9	
Turnout		21,748	86.9	
Liberal gain from Independent		Swing		

1943 Victorian state election: Caulfield
Party	Candidate	Votes	%	±%
United Australia	Harold Cohen	10,972	39.9	−31.6
Independent Socialist	Andrew Hughes	7,702	28.0	+28.0
Labor	Anthonie Verbeek	5,653	20.5	+20.5
Ind. United Australia	Edgar Morton	3,174	11.5	+11.5
Total formal votes		27,501	96.6	−1.6
Informal votes		958	3.4	+1.6
Turnout		28,459	87.6	−5.2
Two-candidate-preferred result
Independent Socialist	Andrew Hughes	14,240	51.8	
United Australia	Harold Cohen	13,261	48.2	
Independent Socialist gain from United Australia		Swing	N/A	

1940 Victorian state election: Caulfield
Party	Candidate	Votes	%	±%
United Australia	Harold Cohen	19,178	71.5	−28.5
Independent	Mary Jones	7,644	28.5	+28.5
Total formal votes		26,822	98.2	
Informal votes		501	1.8	
Turnout		27,323	92.8	
United Australia hold		Swing	N/A	

=== Elections in the 1930s ===
1937 Victorian state election: Caulfield
Party	Candidate	Votes	%	±%
United Australia	Harold Cohen	unopposed		
United Australia hold		Swing		

1935 Victorian state election: Caulfield
Party	Candidate	Votes	%	±%
United Australia	Harold Cohen	13,098	54.9	−20.3
Independent	Edgar Morton	10,772	45.1	+45.1
Total formal votes		23,870	97.7	−1.3
Informal votes		561	2.3	+1.3
Turnout		24,431	95.6	+1.3
United Australia hold		Swing	N/A	

1932 Victorian state election: Caulfield
Party	Candidate	Votes	%	±%
United Australia	Harold Luxton	17,474	75.2	+26.4
Labor	William Ingleby	5,761	24.8	+24.8
Total formal votes		23,225	99.0	+0.1
Informal votes		231	1.0	−0.1
Turnout		23,456	94.3	+0.3
United Australia gain from Australian Liberal		Swing	N/A	

1930 Caulfield state by-election
Party	Candidate	Votes	%	±%
Nationalist	Harold Luxton	7,746	36.2	+36.2
Nationalist	Stanley Savige	5,032	23.5	+23.5
Nationalist	Oscar Mendelsohn	2,662	12.4	−36.4
Australian Liberal	John Murray	2,535	11.8	−39.4
Nationalist	John Packer	2,117	9.9	+9.9
Nationalist	Egbert England	1,329	6.3	+6.3
Total formal votes		21,421	96.4	−2.5
Informal votes		803	3.6	+2.5
Turnout		22,224	90.8	−3.2
Two-candidate-preferred result
Nationalist	Harold Luxton	12,033	56.2	
Nationalist	Stanley Savige	9,388	43.8	
Nationalist gain from Australian Liberal		Swing	N/A	

=== Elections in the 1920s ===
1929 Victorian state election: Caulfield
Party	Candidate	Votes	%	±%
Australian Liberal	Frederick Forrest	11,710	51.2	+8.6
Nationalist	Oscar Mendelsohn	11,148	48.8	+18.7
Total formal votes		22,858	98.9	+2.0
Informal votes		266	1.1	−2.0
Turnout		23,124	94.0	+1.3
Australian Liberal hold		Swing	−13.8	

1927 Victorian state election: Caulfield
Party	Candidate	Votes	%	±%
Australian Liberal	Frederick Forrest	8,953	42.6	
Nationalist	Alfred Farthing	6,329	30.1	
Australian Liberal	John Packer	5,715	27.2	
Total formal votes		20,997	96.9	
Informal votes		679	3.1	
Turnout		21,676	92.7	
Two-candidate-preferred result
Australian Liberal	Frederick Forrest	13,640	65.0	
Nationalist	Alfred Farthing	7,357	35.0	
Australian Liberal gain from Nationalist		Swing		
