= List of Jewish members of Australian parliaments =

Jews have been a part of the Australian parliament since federation. In 2016 a record number of 6 MPs identified as Jewish. When Kerryn Phelps won the 2018 Wentworth by-election the number rose to 7, but subsequently dropped back to 6 following the 2019 Australian federal election.

== Commonwealth ==
=== House ===
Name	Electorate	State	Party	Years	Notes	Source
Sir Isaac Isaacs	Indi	Vic	Protectionist	1901–06	Minister in the Deakin government Chief Justice of Australia; Governor-General of Australia	
Pharez Phillips	Wimmera	Vic	Protectionist	1901–06		
Elias Solomon	Fremantle	WA	Free Trade	1901–03	Mayor of Fremantle	
Vaiben Louis Solomon	South Australia	SA	Free Trade	1901–03	Premier of South Australia	
Max Falstein	Watson	NSW	Labor; Independent	1940–49		
Syd Einfeld	Phillip	NSW	Labor	1961–63		
Joe Berinson	Perth	WA	Labor	1969–75	Minister in Whitlam government	
Moss Cass	Maribyrnong	Vic	Labor	1969–83	Minister in Whitlam government	
Barry Cohen	Robertson	NSW	Labor	1969–90	Minister in Hawke government	
Dick Klugman	Prospect	NSW	Labor	1969–90		
Lewis Kent	Hotham	Vic	Labor	1980–90	Stood for election in Israel for Maki	
Michael Danby	Melbourne Ports	Vic	Labor	1998–2019		
Mark Dreyfus	Isaacs	Vic	Labor	2007–	Minister in Gillard, Rudd and Albanese governments	
Josh Frydenberg	Kooyong	Vic	Liberal	2010–22	Minister in Abbott, Turnbull, and Morrison governments. Deputy leader of the Liberal Party	
Mike Freelander	Macarthur	NSW	Labor	2016–		
Julian Leeser	Berowra	NSW	Liberal	2016–		
Kerryn Phelps	Wentworth	NSW	Independent	2018–19		
Josh Burns	Macnamara	Vic	Labor	2019–		

=== Senate ===
Name	State	Party	Years	Notes	Source
Sam Cohen	Vic	Labour	1961–69	Shadow minister for Education, Science, Communications and the Arts	
Peter Baume, AC	NSW	Liberal	1974–91	Minister for Aboriginals (1980-82), Health (1982), Education (1982-83)	
Stirling Griff	SA	Centre Alliance; Independent	2016–22		

== State parliaments ==
=== New South Wales ===
Name	Electorate	Party	Years	Notes	Source
Maurice Alexander	Goulburn	Independent	1861–72		
Morris Asher	Hume	Independent	1859–60		
Amanda Cohn	Member of the Legislative Council	Greens	2023-		
Henry Cohen	West Maitland	Independent	1874–80		
Ian Cohen	Member of the Legislative Council	Greens	1995–2011		
John Cohen	Petersham	Protectionist Party Liberal Reform Nationalist	1898–1919	Speaker of the Legislative Assembly	
Morton Cohen	Bligh	Liberal	1965–68		
Samuel Cohen	Morpeth	Independent	1860		
Albert Collins	Narrabri Namoi	Liberal Reform Independent Liberal	1901–10		
Charles Collins	Namoi Narrabri	Independent Protectionist Free Trade	1885–87 1890–98		
Margaret Davis	Member of the Legislative Council	Liberal	1967–78		
Syd Einfeld	Bondi Waverley	Labor	1965–1981	Also served in federal parliament Minister in state government	
Samuel Emmanuel	Argyle	Independent	1862–64		
Derek Freeman	Member of the Legislative Council	Liberal	1973–84		
Hyman Goldstein	Eastern Suburbs Coogee	Nationalist	1922–25 1927–28	Mayor of Randwick	
Ron Hoenig	Heffron	Labor	2012–	Mayor of Botany Bay	
Solomon Hyam	Balmain Member of the Legislative Council	Protectionist	1885–87 1892–1901	Mayor of Balmain	
Sir Asher Joel	Member of the Legislative Council	Country Party	1958–78		
Samuel Joseph	West Sydney Member of the Legislative Council	Independent	1864–68 1882–85 1887–93		
John Kaye	Member of the Legislative Council	Greens	2007–16		
Abe Landa	Bondi	Labor	1930–32 1941–65	Minister in state government	
Paul Landa	Member of the Legislative Council Peats	Labor	1973–84		
Leyser Levin	Hume	Independent	1880–85		
Lewis Levy	Liverpool Plains West Maitland	Independent	1871–72 1874		
Sir Daniel Levy	Sydney-Fitzroy Darlinghurst Sydney Paddington Woollahra	Liberal Reform Nationalist United Australia	1901–37	Speaker of the Legislative Assembly	
Ernest Marks	North Sydney	Nationalist	1927–30		
Solomon Meyer	Carcoar	Independent	1874–76		
Ernest Mitchell	Member of the Legislative Council	United Australia Party	1934–43		
Jacob Levi Montefiore	Member of the Legislative Council	Independent	1856–60 1874–77		
Phillip G. Myers	Argyle	Independent	1880–81		
Harris Nelson	Orange	Independent	1872–77		
Simeon Phillips	Dubbo	Free Trade Liberal Reform	1895–1904		
Joseph Raphael	West Sydney	Independent	1872–74		
Eric Roozendaal	Member of the Legislative Council	Labor	2004–13	Minister in state government	
Julian Salomons	Member of the Legislative Council	Independent	1870–71 1887–99	Minister in state government Chief Justice of New South Wales	
Sir Saul Samuel	MLC for counties of Roxburgh, Phillip and Wellington Orange Wellington Member of the Legislative Council	Independent	1854–56 1859–80	Minister in state government Received baronet	
Leon Snider	Member of the Legislative Council	Liberal Country Party	1943–65		

=== Northern Territory ===
Name	Electorate	Party	Years	Notes	Source
Jon Isaacs	Millner	Labor	1977–81	Leader of the Opposition	

=== Queensland ===
Name	Electorate	Party	Years	Notes	Source
Louis Goldring	Flinders	Independent	1888–93	Mayor of Hughenden	
Jacob Horwitz	Warwick	Liberal Party	1878–87	Mayor of Warwick	
Francis Benjamin Kates	Darling Downs Cunningham	Independent	1878–81 1883–88 1899–1903		
Isidor Lissner	Kennedy Cairns	Ministerialist	1883–93 1896–99		

=== South Australia ===
Name	Electorate	Party	Years	Notes	Source
Sir Lewis Cohen	North Adelaide Adelaide	Independent ADL	1887–93 1902–06	Mayor of Adelaide	
Morris Lyon Marks	The Burra and Clare	Independent	1857–58		
Maurice Salom	MLC for South Australia	Independent	1882–91		
Emanuel Solomon	West Adelaide MLC for South Australia	Independent	1862–65 1867–71		
Judah Moss Solomon	City of Adelaide MLC for South Australia West Adelaide	Independent	1858–60 1861–65 1871–75	Mayor of Adelaide	
Saul Solomon	East Torrens	Independent	1887–90		
Vaiben Louis Solomon	Northern Territory	Independent National Defence League	1890–1901 1905–08	Premier of South Australia Also served in federal parliament	

=== Tasmania ===
Name	Electorate	Party	Years	Notes	Source
Joseph Cohen	Launceston	Independent	1860–61		
John Davies	Hobart Town Devon Franklin	Independent	1884–1913	Mayor of Hobart	

=== Victoria ===
Name	Electorate	Party	Years	Notes	Source
Sir Benjamin Benjamin	MLC for Melbourne Province	Independent	1889–92	Mayor of Melbourne	
David Bornstein	Brunswick East	Labor	1970–75		
Edward Cohen	East Melbourne	Independent	1861–65 1868–77	Mayor of Melbourne	
Harold Cohen	Caulfield MLC for Melbourne South	Nationalist United Australia Party	1929–35 1935–43	Minister in state government	
Henry Cohen	MLC for Melbourne Province	Nationalist	1921–37	Minister in state government	
Philip Dalidakis	MLC for Southern Metropolitan Region	Labor	2014–19	Minister in state government	
Charles Dyte	Ballarat East	Independent	1864–71		
Benjamin Fink	Maryborough and Talbot	Independent	1883–89		
Theodore Fink	Jolimont and West Richmond	Independent	1894–1904		
Adolphus Goldsmith	MLC for Ripon, Hampden, Grenville and Polwarth	Independent	1851–53		
Paul Hamer	Box Hill	Labor	2018–		
Max Hirsch	Mandurang	Ministerial	1902–03		
Jennifer Huppert	MLC for Southern Metropolitan	Labor	2009–10		
Sir Isaac Isaacs	Bogong	Independent	1892–1901		
John Alfred Isaacs	Ovens	Independent	1894–1902		
Walter Jona	Hawthorn	Liberal	1964–85	Minister in state government	
Daniel Barnet Lazarus	Sandhurst	Independent	1893–97 1900–02	Mayor of Sandhurst	
Nathaniel Levi	Maryborough East Melbourne MLC for North Yarra Province	Independent	1860–65 1866–68 1892–1904		
Jonas Levien	South Grant Barwon	Independent	1871–77 1880–1906	Minister in state government	
Archie Michaelis	St Kilda	United Australia Party Liberal	1932–52	Speaker of the Legislative Assembly	
Martin Pakula	MLC for Western Metropolitan Lyndhurst Keysborough	Labor	2006–2022	Minister in state government	
Pharez Phillips	MLC for North Western Province	Independent	1896–1901		
Sidney Ricardo	South Bourke	Independent	1857–59		
Samuel Samuel	Dundas	Independent	1892–92		
Helen Shardey	Electoral district of Caulfield	Liberal	1996–2010		
Baron Snider	St Kilda MLC for Higinbotham Province	Liberal	1955–66		
David Southwick	Caulfield	Liberal	2010–	Deputy Leader of the Liberal Party in Victoria since 2021	
Emanuel Steinfeld	MLC for Wellington	Independent	1892–93		
Joseph Sternberg	MLC for Northern Province MLC for Bendigo	Independent Nationalist	1891–1902 1904–1928		
Marsha Thomson	MLC for Melbourne North Footscray	Labor	2006–18	Minister in state government	
Evan Thornley	MLC for Southern Metropolitan	Labor	2006–08		
Ephraim Zox	East Melbourne	Independent	1877–99		

=== Western Australia ===
Name	Electorate	Party	Years	Notes	Source
Joe Berinson	MLC for North-East Metropolitan Province MLC for North Central Metropolitan Province MLC for North Metropolitan	Labor	1980–93	Also served in federal parliament Minister in the Whitlam government	
Harry Boan	Metropolitan Province Metropolitan-Suburban Province	WA Liberal Party Nationalist	1917–18 1922–24		
Matthew Moss	North Fremantle MLC for West Province	Independent WA Liberal Party	1895–97 1900–01 1902–14	Minister in state government	
Sir Charles Nathan	MLC for Metropolitan-Suburban Province	Nationalist	1930–34		
Lionel Samson	MLC for Western Australian	Independent	1849–56 1859–68		
Elias Solomon	South Fremantle	Independent	1892–1901	Mayor of Fremantle Also served in federal parliament	

== See also ==
- Lists of Jews in politics
- List of Jewish governors of Australia
- List of LGBTQ holders of political offices in Australia
- List of Indigenous Australian politicians
- List of Asian Australian politicians
- History of Islam in Australia
- Religion in Australia
- Racism in Australia
