= Electoral results for the Division of Melbourne Ports =

Australian division election results

This is a list of electoral results for the Division of Melbourne Ports in Australian federal elections from the division's creation in 1901 until its abolition in 2019. It was replaced by the division of Macnamara which had almost identical boundaries.

== Members ==
Member	Party	Term
Samuel Mauger	Protectionist	1901–1906
James Mathews	Labor	1906–1931
Jack Holloway	Labor	1931–1951
Frank Crean	Labor	1951–1977
Clyde Holding	Labor	1977–1998
Michael Danby	Labor	1998–2019

== Election results ==
=== Elections in the 2010s ===
==== 2016 ====
2016 Australian federal election: Melbourne Ports
Party	Candidate	Votes	%	±%
Liberal	Owen Guest	35,533	41.90	+0.85
Labor	Michael Danby	22,897	27.00	−4.67
Greens	Steph Hodgins-May	20,179	23.79	+3.62
Animal Justice	Robert Smyth	1,685	1.99	+1.99
Independent	Peter Holland	1,393	1.64	+1.64
Marriage Equality	Henry von Doussa	1,349	1.59	+1.59
Drug Law Reform	Levi McKenzie-Kirkbright	1,348	1.59	+1.59
Independent	John Myers	425	0.50	+0.50
Total formal votes		84,809	95.76	−0.42
Informal votes		3,756	4.24	+0.42
Turnout		88,565	86.59	−3.45
Two-party-preferred result
Labor	Michael Danby	43,573	51.38	−2.18
Liberal	Owen Guest	41,236	48.62	+2.18
Labor hold		Swing	−2.18	

==== 2013 ====
2013 Australian federal election: Melbourne Ports
Party	Candidate	Votes	%	±%
Liberal	Kevin Ekendahl	33,278	41.05	+3.66
Labor	Michael Danby	25,676	31.67	−6.56
Greens	Ann Birrell	16,353	20.17	−0.82
Sex Party	Melissa Star	3,089	3.81	+1.59
Palmer United	Toby Stodart	1,122	1.38	+1.38
Democratic Labour	Vince Stefano	540	0.67	+0.67
Family First	Robert Keenan	490	0.60	−0.14
Stable Population	Steven Armstrong	324	0.40	+0.40
Rise Up Australia	Margaret Quinn	201	0.25	+0.25
Total formal votes		81,073	96.18	−0.59
Informal votes		3,223	3.82	+0.59
Turnout		84,296	90.14	+0.61
Two-party-preferred result
Labor	Michael Danby	43,419	53.56	−4.33
Liberal	Kevin Ekendahl	37,654	46.44	+4.33
Labor hold		Swing	−4.33	

==== 2010 ====
2010 Australian federal election: Melbourne Ports
Party	Candidate	Votes	%	±%
Labor	Michael Danby	32,391	38.19	−4.28
Liberal	Kevin Ekendahl	32,057	37.79	−1.89
Greens	Sue Plowright	17,528	20.66	+5.63
Sex Party	Christian Vega	1,851	2.18	+2.18
Family First	Daniel Emmerson	632	0.75	−0.10
Secular	Gregory Storer	362	0.43	+0.43
Total formal votes		84,821	96.75	−1.09
Informal votes		2,848	3.25	+1.09
Turnout		87,669	89.67	−2.05
Two-party-preferred result
Labor	Michael Danby	48,819	57.56	+0.41
Liberal	Kevin Ekendahl	36,002	42.44	−0.41
Labor hold		Swing	+0.41	

=== Elections in the 2000s ===
==== 2007 ====
2007 Australian federal election: Melbourne Ports
Party	Candidate	Votes	%	±%
Labor	Michael Danby	36,556	42.47	+3.22
Liberal	Adam Held	34,154	39.68	−3.26
Greens	Phillip Walker	12,941	15.03	+0.93
Democrats	John Mathieson	1,527	1.77	+0.42
Family First	Rebecca Gebbing	731	0.85	+0.31
Citizens Electoral Council	Aaron Isherwood	172	0.20	+0.02
Total formal votes		86,081	97.84	+1.24
Informal votes		1,903	2.16	−1.24
Turnout		87,984	91.71	+0.58
Two-party-preferred result
Labor	Michael Danby	49,191	57.15	+3.41
Liberal	Adam Held	36,890	42.85	−3.41
Labor hold		Swing	+3.41	

==== 2004 ====
2004 Australian federal election: Melbourne Ports
Party	Candidate	Votes	%	±%
Liberal	David Southwick	35,058	42.94	+3.23
Labor	Michael Danby	32,046	39.25	−0.11
Greens	Jo Lewis	11,508	14.10	+2.82
Democrats	Craig Beale	1,102	1.35	−7.92
Independent	Les Cameron	958	1.17	+1.17
Family First	Graeme Jackel	444	0.54	+0.54
Independent	Leonie Horin	374	0.46	+0.46
Citizens Electoral Council	Aaron Isherwood	146	0.18	−0.21
Total formal votes		81,636	96.60	−0.14
Informal votes		2,875	3.40	+0.14
Turnout		84,511	91.13	−1.79
Two-party-preferred result
Labor	Michael Danby	43,873	53.74	−1.95
Liberal	David Southwick	37,763	46.26	+1.95
Labor hold		Swing	−1.95	

==== 2001 ====
2001 Australian federal election: Melbourne Ports
Party	Candidate	Votes	%	±%
Liberal	Andrew McLorinan	31,384	39.71	+0.72
Labor	Michael Danby	31,110	39.36	−4.74
Greens	Jeannette Kavanagh	8,912	11.28	+6.55
Democrats	Greg Chipp	7,328	9.27	+1.08
Citizens Electoral Council	Jeremy Beck	305	0.39	+0.39
Total formal votes		79,039	96.74	−0.15
Informal votes		2,662	3.26	+0.15
Turnout		81,701	92.32	
Two-party-preferred result
Labor	Michael Danby	44,018	55.69	−0.14
Liberal	Andrew McLorinan	35,021	44.31	+0.14
Labor hold		Swing	−0.14	

=== Elections in the 1990s ===
==== 1998 ====
1998 Australian federal election: Melbourne Ports
Party	Candidate	Votes	%	±%
Labor	Michael Danby	32,849	44.10	−2.47
Liberal	Fiona Snedden	29,037	38.99	−0.74
Democrats	Julie Peters	6,099	8.19	+1.10
Greens	Dinesh Mathew	3,523	4.73	−0.43
Unity	Diana Wolowski	1,413	1.90	+1.90
One Nation	Arthur Hawley	1,380	1.85	+1.85
Natural Law	Tom Haynes	180	0.24	−0.25
Total formal votes		74,481	96.89	−0.35
Informal votes		2,390	3.11	+0.35
Turnout		76,871	92.34	−1.10
Two-party-preferred result
Labor	Michael Danby	41,585	55.83	−0.22
Liberal	Fiona Snedden	32,896	44.17	+0.22
Labor hold		Swing	−0.22	

==== 1996 ====
1996 Australian federal election: Melbourne Ports
Party	Candidate	Votes	%	±%
Labor	Clyde Holding	33,838	46.58	−2.08
Liberal	Margot Foster	28,863	39.73	−2.02
Democrats	John Davey	5,147	7.08	+3.42
Greens	Misha Coleman	3,746	5.16	+5.16
Against Further Immigration	Margaret Gillespie-Jones	700	0.96	+0.96
Natural Law	Robert Brown	357	0.49	−0.46
Total formal votes		72,651	97.24	+0.16
Informal votes		2,065	2.76	−0.16
Turnout		74,716	93.44	−0.22
Two-party-preferred result
Labor	Clyde Holding	40,399	56.05	+0.20
Liberal	Margot Foster	31,679	43.95	−0.20
Labor hold		Swing	+0.20	

==== 1993 ====
1993 Australian federal election: Melbourne Ports
Party	Candidate	Votes	%	±%
Labor	Clyde Holding	34,751	48.65	+9.10
Liberal	Helen Friedmann	29,817	41.74	−1.86
Democrats	Beverley Broadbent	2,614	3.66	−11.85
Independent	Andrew Colbert	2,291	3.21	+3.21
	Christine Craik	1,276	1.79	+1.79
Natural Law	Caroline Hockley	678	0.95	+0.95
Total formal votes		71,427	97.07	+0.55
Informal votes		2,153	2.93	−0.55
Turnout		73,580	93.66	
Two-party-preferred result
Labor	Clyde Holding	39,862	55.85	+3.80
Liberal	Helen Friedmann	31,513	44.15	−3.80
Labor hold		Swing	+3.80	

==== 1990 ====
1990 Australian federal election: Melbourne Ports
Party	Candidate	Votes	%	±%
Liberal	Allan Paull	29,032	43.6	+2.9
Labor	Clyde Holding	26,335	39.6	−4.5
Democrats	David Collyer	10,327	15.5	+6.2
Democratic Socialist	Greg Loats	886	1.3	+1.3
Total formal votes		66,580	96.5	
Informal votes		2,399	3.5	
Turnout		68,979	93.6	
Two-party-preferred result
Labor	Clyde Holding	34,594	52.1	−1.8
Liberal	Allan Paull	31,872	47.9	+1.8
Labor hold		Swing	−1.8	

=== Elections in the 1980s ===
==== 1987 ====
1987 Australian federal election: Melbourne Ports
Party	Candidate	Votes	%	±%
Labor	Clyde Holding	29,831	50.1	−7.0
Liberal	Allan Paull	20,683	34.7	+3.9
Democrats	Di Bretherton	5,568	9.3	+3.5
Independent	Alan Brown	3,483	5.9	+5.9
Total formal votes		59,565	93.6	
Informal votes		4,039	6.4	
Turnout		63,604	87.9	
Two-party-preferred result
Labor	Clyde Holding	35,643	59.9	−4.3
Liberal	Allan Paull	23,831	40.1	+4.3
Labor hold		Swing	−4.3	

==== 1984 ====
1984 Australian federal election: Melbourne Ports
Party	Candidate	Votes	%	±%
Labor	Clyde Holding	32,665	57.1	−3.6
Liberal	Allan Paull	17,603	30.8	−1.7
Democrats	Sue McDougall	3,312	5.8	+0.0
Democratic Labor	Michael Rowe	1,825	3.2	+3.2
Independent	Denice Stephens	845	1.5	+1.5
National	Dorothy Turner	795	1.4	+1.4
Independent	Russell Morse	159	0.3	+0.3
Total formal votes		57,204	88.1	
Informal votes		7,728	11.9	
Turnout		64,932	90.6	
Two-party-preferred result
Labor	Clyde Holding	36,690	64.2	+1.1
Liberal	Allan Paull	20,427	35.8	−1.1
Labor hold		Swing	+1.1	

==== 1983 ====
1983 Australian federal election: Melbourne Ports
Party	Candidate	Votes	%	±%
Labor	Clyde Holding	36,444	59.7	+2.7
Liberal	Ronald Flood	20,488	33.5	−0.4
Democrats	John Sutcliffe	3,556	5.8	−1.5
Socialist Workers	Brett Trenery	595	1.0	+1.0
Total formal votes		61,083	97.3	
Informal votes		1,688	2.7	
Turnout		62,751	91.6	
Two-party-preferred result
Labor	Clyde Holding		64.1	+1.8
Liberal	Ronald Flood		35.9	−1.8
Labor hold		Swing	+1.8	

==== 1980 ====
1980 Australian federal election: Melbourne Ports
Party	Candidate	Votes	%	±%
Labor	Clyde Holding	33,992	57.0	+7.0
Liberal	Colin Bell	20,252	33.9	+0.9
Democrats	Stephen Duthy	4,336	7.3	−2.5
Independent	Gordon Moffatt	806	1.4	+1.4
Independent	Wilhelm Kapphan	270	0.5	+0.5
Total formal votes		59,656	96.2	
Informal votes		2,373	3.8	
Turnout		62,029	89.5	
Two-party-preferred result
Labor	Clyde Holding		62.3	+6.8
Liberal	Colin Bell		37.7	−6.8
Labor hold		Swing	+6.8	

=== Elections in the 1970s ===
==== 1977 ====
1977 Australian federal election: Melbourne Ports
Party	Candidate	Votes	%	±%
Labor	Clyde Holding	31,308	50.0	−5.5
Liberal	Daniel Hill	20,627	33.0	−5.0
Democrats	Valina Rainer	6,147	9.8	+9.8
Democratic Labor	Gordon Haberman	4,495	7.2	+4.5
Total formal votes		62,577	96.1	
Informal votes		2,567	3.9	
Turnout		65,144	90.9	
Two-party-preferred result
Labor	Clyde Holding		55.5	−2.8
Liberal	Daniel Hill		44.5	+2.8
Labor hold		Swing	−2.8	

==== 1975 ====
1975 Australian federal election: Melbourne Ports
Party	Candidate	Votes	%	±%
Labor	Frank Crean	28,460	55.5	−4.9
Liberal	Roger Johnston	19,485	38.0	+7.4
Australia	Beverley Broadbent	1,641	3.2	−1.5
Democratic Labor	Gordon Haberman	1,369	2.7	−1.6
National Country	Frederick Gray	168	0.3	+0.3
Independent	Henry Sanders	154	0.3	+0.3
Total formal votes		51,277	97.1	
Informal votes		1,553	2.9	
Turnout		52,830	91.1	
Two-party-preferred result
Labor	Frank Crean		58.3	−5.8
Liberal	Roger Johnston		41.7	+5.8
Labor hold		Swing	−5.8	

==== 1974 ====
1974 Australian federal election: Melbourne Ports
Party	Candidate	Votes	%	±%
Labor	Frank Crean	31,120	60.4	−1.1
Liberal	John Walsh	15,733	30.6	+0.1
Australia	Beverley Broadbent	2,429	4.7	+4.7
Democratic Labor	John Johnston	2,211	4.3	−3.7
Total formal votes		51,493	97.1	
Informal votes		1,556	2.9	
Turnout		53,049	92.3	
Two-party-preferred result
Labor	Frank Crean		64.1	+1.8
Liberal	John Walsh		35.9	−1.8
Labor hold		Swing	+1.8	

==== 1972 ====
1972 Australian federal election: Melbourne Ports
Party	Candidate	Votes	%	±%
Labor	Frank Crean	29,631	61.5	+9.5
Liberal	Paul Fenton	14,722	30.5	−2.4
Democratic Labor	John Johnston	3,845	8.0	−0.1
Total formal votes		48,198	97.0	
Informal votes		1,476	3.0	
Turnout		49,674	91.3	
Two-party-preferred result
Labor	Frank Crean		62.3	+6.0
Liberal	Paul Fenton		37.7	−6.0
Labor hold		Swing	+6.0	

=== Elections in the 1960s ===
==== 1969 ====
1969 Australian federal election: Melbourne Ports
Party	Candidate	Votes	%	±%
Labor	Frank Crean	25,209	52.0	+12.3
Liberal	Kevin Randall	15,923	32.9	−7.6
Democratic Labor	Eustace Tracey	3,944	8.1	−3.4
Independent	Reg Macey	1,580	3.3	+3.3
Independent	Stephen Graves	1,447	3.0	+3.0
Independent	George Gabriel	352	0.7	+0.7
Total formal votes		48,455	94.6	
Informal votes		2,745	5.4	
Turnout		51,200	91.4	
Two-party-preferred result
Labor	Frank Crean		56.3	+8.0
Liberal	Kevin Randall		43.7	−8.0
Labor gain from Liberal		Swing	+8.0	

==== 1966 ====
1966 Australian federal election: Melbourne Ports
Party	Candidate	Votes	%	±%
Labor	Frank Crean	16,003	55.5	−8.0
Liberal	Richard Thomas	7,123	24.7	+2.6
Democratic Labor	George O'Dwyer	3,304	11.5	−1.0
Communist	David Clark	2,402	8.3	+6.4
Total formal votes		28,832	94.9	
Informal votes		1,543	5.1	
Turnout		30,375	94.2	
Two-party-preferred result
Labor	Frank Crean		64.1	−2.4
Liberal	Richard Thomas		35.9	+2.4
Labor hold		Swing	−2.4	

==== 1963 ====
1963 Australian federal election: Melbourne Ports
Party	Candidate	Votes	%	±%
Labor	Frank Crean	20,654	63.5	+1.8
Liberal	James Pond	7,178	22.1	−0.3
Democratic Labor	George O'Dwyer	4,074	12.5	−1.2
Communist	Roger Wilson	632	1.9	−0.3
Total formal votes		32,538	97.7	
Informal votes		781	2.3	
Turnout		33,319	95.1	
Two-party-preferred result
Labor	Frank Crean		66.5	+1.4
Liberal	James Pond		33.5	−1.4
Labor hold		Swing	+1.4	

==== 1961 ====
1961 Australian federal election: Melbourne Ports
Party	Candidate	Votes	%	±%
Labor	Frank Crean	20,590	61.7	−1.9
Liberal	Gordon Blackburne	7,483	22.4	+2.0
Democratic Labor	Albert Jones	4,572	13.7	−0.1
Communist	Roger Wilson	749	2.2	−0.1
Total formal votes		33,394	96.5	
Informal votes		1,201	3.5	
Turnout		34,595	93.7	
Two-party-preferred result
Labor	Frank Crean		65.1	−2.1
Liberal	Gordon Blackburne		34.9	+2.1
Labor hold		Swing	−2.1	

=== Elections in the 1950s ===
==== 1958 ====
1958 Australian federal election: Melbourne Ports
Party	Candidate	Votes	%	±%
Labor	Frank Crean	22,968	63.6	+11.6
Liberal	Norman Loader	7,381	20.4	+0.7
Democratic Labor	John Fitzgerald	4,969	13.8	−11.4
Communist	Roger Wilson	813	2.3	−0.8
Total formal votes		36,131	96.4	
Informal votes		1,362	3.6	
Turnout		37,493	95.0	
Two-party-preferred result
Labor	Frank Crean		67.2	+10.4
Liberal	Norman Loader		32.8	+32.8
Labor hold		Swing	+10.4	

==== 1955 ====
1955 Australian federal election: Melbourne Ports
Party	Candidate	Votes	%	±%
Labor	Frank Crean	19,917	52.0	−14.7
Labor (A-C)	Stan Corrigan	9,662	25.2	+25.2
Liberal	Harold Sher	7,531	19.7	−7.8
Communist	Alex Dobbin	1,193	3.1	−2.7
Total formal votes		38,303	95.9	
Informal votes		1,645	4.1	
Turnout		39,948	93.9	
Two-party-preferred result
Labor	Frank Crean		56.8	−15.0
Labor (A-C)	Stan Corrigan		43.2	+43.2
Labor hold		Swing	−15.0	

==== 1954 ====
1954 Australian federal election: Melbourne Ports
Party	Candidate	Votes	%	±%
Labor	Frank Crean	22,001	67.4	−3.8
Liberal	Norman Fittock	8,914	27.3	−1.5
Communist	Ted Bull	1,733	5.3	+5.3
Total formal votes		32,648	98.0	
Informal votes		677	2.0	
Turnout		33,325	95.2	
Two-party-preferred result
Labor	Frank Crean		72.3	+1.1
Liberal	Norman Fittock		27.7	−1.1
Labor hold		Swing	+1.1	

==== 1951 ====
1951 Australian federal election: Melbourne Ports
Party	Candidate	Votes	%	±%
Labor	Frank Crean	26,502	71.2	+3.3
Liberal	Michael Prowse	10,740	28.8	−3.3
Total formal votes		37,242	97.8	
Informal votes		839	2.2	
Turnout		38,081	94.9	
Labor hold		Swing	+3.3	

=== Elections in the 1940s ===
==== 1949 ====
1949 Australian federal election: Melbourne Ports
Party	Candidate	Votes	%	±%
Labor	Jack Holloway	26,792	67.9	−2.5
Liberal	Frank Block	12,690	32.1	+2.5
Total formal votes		39,482	97.2	
Informal votes		1,137	2.8	
Turnout		40,619	94.6	
Labor hold		Swing	−2.5	

==== 1946 ====
1946 Australian federal election: Melbourne Ports
Party	Candidate	Votes	%	±%
Labor	Jack Holloway	43,905	66.7	−6.1
Liberal	Douglas Dennis	21,884	33.3	+6.1
Total formal votes		65,789	97.5	
Informal votes		1,705	2.5	
Turnout		67,494	92.2	
Labor hold		Swing	−6.1	

==== 1943 ====
1943 Australian federal election: Melbourne Ports
Party	Candidate	Votes	%	±%
Labor	Jack Holloway	47,149	72.8	+6.7
United Australia	Frank Preacher	17,629	27.2	−6.7
Total formal votes		64,778	97.6	
Informal votes		1,612	2.4	
Turnout		66,390	95.7	
Labor hold		Swing	+6.7	

==== 1940 ====
1940 Australian federal election: Melbourne Ports
Party	Candidate	Votes	%	±%
Labor	Jack Holloway	38,853	66.1	−33.9
United Australia	Raymond Trickey	19,907	33.9	+33.9
Total formal votes		58,760	97.6	
Informal votes		1,428	2.4	
Total votes		60,188	94.7	
Labor hold		Swing	−33.9	

=== Elections in the 1930s ===
==== 1937 ====
1937 Australian federal election: Melbourne Ports
Party	Candidate	Votes	%	±%
Labor	Jack Holloway	unopposed		
Labor hold		Swing		

==== 1934 ====
1934 Australian federal election: Melbourne Ports
Party	Candidate	Votes	%	±%
Labor	Jack Holloway	27,081	62.8	−6.4
United Australia	James Laurence	12,173	28.2	−2.1
Socialist	William Clarke	3,872	9.0	+9.0
Total formal votes		43,126	95.7	
Informal votes		1,941	4.3	
Turnout		45,067	93.2	
Two-party-preferred result
Labor	Jack Holloway		70.9	+10.6
United Australia	James Laurence		29.1	−10.6
Labor hold		Swing	+10.6	

==== 1931 ====
1931 Australian federal election: Melbourne Ports
Party	Candidate	Votes	%	±%
Labor	Jack Holloway	22,901	56.4	−43.6
United Australia	William Orr	12,319	30.3	+30.3
Ind. United Australia	William Howey	3,945	9.7	+9.7
Communist	Thomas le Huray	823	2.0	+2.0
Lang Labor	Thomas Houston	448	1.1	+1.1
Independent	Noble Kerby	154	0.4	+0.4
Total formal votes		40,590	94.3	
Informal votes		2,445	5.7	
Turnout		43,035	95.2	
Two-party-preferred result
Labor	Jack Holloway		60.3	−39.7
United Australia	William Orr		39.7	+39.7
Labor hold		Swing	−39.7	

=== Elections in the 1920s ===
==== 1929 ====
1929 Australian federal election: Melbourne Ports
Party	Candidate	Votes	%	±%
Labor	James Mathews	unopposed		
Labor hold		Swing		

==== 1928 ====
1928 Australian federal election: Melbourne Ports
Party	Candidate	Votes	%	±%
Labor	James Mathews	unopposed		
Labor hold		Swing		

==== 1925 ====
1925 Australian federal election: Melbourne Ports
Party	Candidate	Votes	%	±%
Labor	James Mathews	29,416	67.7	−5.4
Nationalist	Frank Wilcher	14,035	32.3	+5.4
Total formal votes		43,451	98.2	
Informal votes		792	1.8	
Turnout		44,243	89.7	
Labor hold		Swing	−5.4	

==== 1922 ====
1922 Australian federal election: Melbourne Ports
Party	Candidate	Votes	%	±%
Labor	James Mathews	17,628	73.1	−26.9
Nationalist	Selwyn Neale	6,485	26.9	+26.9
Total formal votes		24,113	97.0	
Informal votes		745	3.0	
Turnout		24,858	54.1	
Labor hold		Swing	−26.9	

=== Elections in the 1910s ===
==== 1919 ====
1919 Australian federal election: Melbourne Ports
Party	Candidate	Votes	%	±%
Labor	James Mathews	unopposed		
Labor hold		Swing		

==== 1917 ====
1917 Australian federal election: Melbourne Ports
Party	Candidate	Votes	%	±%
Labor	James Mathews	22,689	66.3	−33.7
Nationalist	William Fozard	11,557	33.7	+33.7
Total formal votes		34,246	97.7	
Informal votes		801	2.3	
Turnout		35,047	80.5	
Labor hold		Swing	−33.7	

==== 1914 ====
1914 Australian federal election: Melbourne Ports
Party	Candidate	Votes	%	±%
Labor	James Mathews	unopposed		
Labor hold		Swing		

==== 1913 ====
1913 Australian federal election: Melbourne Ports
Party	Candidate	Votes	%	±%
Labor	James Mathews	24,203	79.2	+10.6
Liberal	Charles Merrett	6,357	20.8	−10.6
Total formal votes		30,560	97.9	
Informal votes		659	2.1	
Turnout		31,219	75.0	
Labor hold		Swing	+10.6	

==== 1910 ====
1910 Australian federal election: Melbourne Ports
Party	Candidate	Votes	%	±%
Labour	James Mathews	15,055	69.6	+29.0
Liberal	Alexander Ramsay	6,583	30.4	−5.0
Total formal votes		21,638	98.3	
Informal votes		368	1.7	
Turnout		22,006	65.4	
Labour hold		Swing	+17.0	

=== Elections in the 1900s ===
==== 1906 ====
1906 Australian federal election: Melbourne Ports
Party	Candidate	Votes	%	±%
Labour	James Mathews	6,813	40.6	−1.3
Protectionist	Edward Watts	5,932	35.4	−20.1
Independent Labour	James Ronald	3,215	19.2	+19.2
Ind. Anti-Socialist	Cyril James	802	4.8	+4.8
Total formal votes		16,762	95.9	
Informal votes		714	4.1	
Turnout		17,476	55.9	
Labour gain from Protectionist		Swing	+9.4	

==== 1903 ====
1903 Australian federal election: Melbourne Ports
Party	Candidate	Votes	%	±%
Protectionist	Samuel Mauger	9,646	55.5	−44.5
Labour	James Mathews	7,290	41.9	+41.9
Independent Labour	Harry Foran	443	2.5	+2.5
Total formal votes		17,379	97.8	
Informal votes		386	2.2	
Turnout		17,765	55.7	
Protectionist hold		Swing	−44.5	

==== 1901 ====
1901 Australian federal election: Melbourne Ports
Party	Candidate	Votes	%	±%
Protectionist	Samuel Mauger	unopposed		
Protectionist win		(new seat)		

== See also ==
- Electoral results for the Division of Macnamara
