= Electoral results for the Division of Macnamara =

Australian division election results

This is a list of electoral results for the Division of Macnamara in Australian federal elections from the division's creation in 2019 until the present.

== Members ==
Member	Party	Term
Josh Burns	Labor	2019–present

== Election results ==
=== Elections in the 2020s ===
==== 2025 ====
2025 Australian federal election: Macnamara
Party	Candidate	Votes	%	±%
Labor	Josh Burns			
One Nation	Sean Rubin			
Greens	Sonya Semmens			
Liberal	Benson Saulo			
Libertarian	Michael Abelman			
Independent	JB Myers			
Total formal votes				
Informal votes				
Turnout				

==== 2022 ====
2022 Australian federal election: Macnamara
Party	Candidate	Votes	%	±%
Labor	Josh Burns	29,552	31.77	+0.93
Greens	Steph Hodgins-May	27,587	29.65	+5.46
Liberal	Colleen Harkin	26,976	29.00	−9.72
United Australia	Jane Hickey	2,062	2.22	+1.01
Liberal Democrats	Rob McCathie	1,946	2.09	+2.09
Independent	John Myers	1,835	1.97	+1.97
Animal Justice	Ben Schultz	1,724	1.85	−0.08
One Nation	Debera Anne	1,349	1.45	+1.45
Total formal votes		93,031	96.57	+0.36
Informal votes		3,302	3.43	−0.36
Turnout		96,333	87.10	−2.84
Two-party-preferred result
Labor	Josh Burns	57,911	62.25	+7.34
Liberal	Colleen Harkin	35,120	37.75	−7.34
Labor hold		Swing	+7.34	

Alluvial diagram for preference flows in the seat of Macnamara in the 2022 federal election. indicates at what stage the winning candidate had over 50% of the votes and was declared the winner.

=== Elections in the 2010s ===
==== 2019 ====
2019 Australian federal election: Macnamara
Party	Candidate	Votes	%	±%
Liberal	Kate Ashmor	36,283	37.37	−4.60
Labor	Josh Burns	30,855	31.78	+5.24
Greens	Steph Hodgins-May	23,534	24.24	+0.08
Animal Justice	Craig McPherson	1,919	1.98	0.00
United Australia	Helen Paton	1,136	1.17	+1.17
Independent	Ruby O'Rourke	1,108	1.14	+1.14
Sustainable Australia	Steven Armstrong	974	1.00	+1.00
Independent	Chris Wallis	918	0.95	+0.95
Rise Up Australia	Christine Kay	365	0.38	+0.38
Total formal votes		97,092	95.77	0.00
Informal votes		4,288	4.23	0.00
Turnout		101,380	89.08	+2.80
Two-party-preferred result
Labor	Josh Burns	54,613	56.25	+5.04
Liberal	Kate Ashmor	42,479	43.75	−5.04
Labor notional hold		Swing	+5.04	

Macnamara was a new electorate, notionally held by Labor.

== See also ==
- Electoral results for the Division of Melbourne Ports
