= List of Jewish governors of Australia =

There have been a number of Jews to take up the position of governor of one of the states or Governor-General of Australia. This role is as the representative of the monarch in Australia.

Image	Name	Position	Years served	Source
	Sir Matthew Nathan	Governor of Queensland	1920–1925	
	Sir Isaac Isaacs	Governor-General	1931–1936	
	Sir Zelman Cowen	Governor-General	1977–1982	
	Gordon Samuels	Governor of New South Wales	1996–2001	
	Linda Dessau	Governor of Victoria	2015–2023	

== See also ==
* List of Jewish members of Australian parliaments
