= Louise Hanson-Dyer =

Australian music publisher and patron of the arts

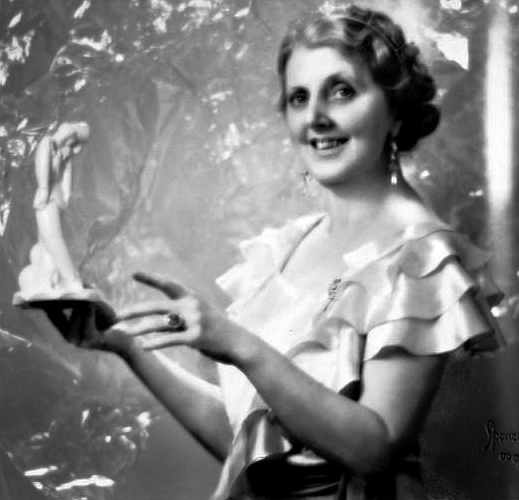
Louise Hanson-Dyer (ca. 1920)

Louise Berta Mosson Hanson-Dyer (19 July 1884 – 9 November 1962) was an Australian music publisher and patron of the arts.

== Biography ==
She was born Louise Berta Mosson Smith in Melbourne, the daughter of Louis Smith, a medical practitioner and parliamentarian. Her brother was Sir Harold Gengoult Smith, the Lord Mayor of Melbourne from 1931 to 1934. She was a talented pianist, studying at the Albert Street Conservatorium, then from 1907 to 1908 in London and Edinburgh.

She married James Dyer, a Scottish businessman 27 years her senior, in 1911. Dyer had an active social life, being president of the Presbyterian Ladies' Old Scholars from 1919 to 1921 and from 1924 to 1926. She was also an active member of the Alliance Française. She was a generous patron of the arts who organised private concerts of Baroque music, especially French. She was the major force in establishing the British Music Society of Victoria in 1921. In 1924, she helped John Shaw Neilson publish his first major book of poetry, and later donated £10,000 to help found the Melbourne Symphony Orchestra.

She and her husband moved to London 1927, then Paris in 1928, where they commenced what was to become a remarkable collection of printed music, scores and scholarly material from the 15th to 19th centuries. She founded Éditions de l'Oiseau-Lyre in 1932, printing impeccable historical editions of the music of Lully, Couperin, Jacopo da Bologna and Purcell, then branched out into recorded performances, which became their major focus. She also published works of modern Australian composers, notably Peggy Glanville-Hicks and Margaret Sutherland. She continued to run the publishing house until the year she died. She helped promote modern composers including Georges Auric, Benjamin Britten, Joseph Canteloube, Gustav Holst, Jacques Ibert, Vincent d'Indy, Charles Koechlin, Darius Milhaud, Albert Roussel and Henri Sauguet She was appointed chevalier of the Legion of Honour in 1934 and promoted to officier in 1957.

James Dyer died in 1938. The following year she married 30-year-old British literary scholar Joseph Birch "Jeff" Hanson and moved to England, where he was studying at Balliol College, Oxford. They moved to Monaco in 1945 where she died, leaving her Australian assets, valued at around £240,000, to the University of Melbourne. Her European assets were left to her husband.

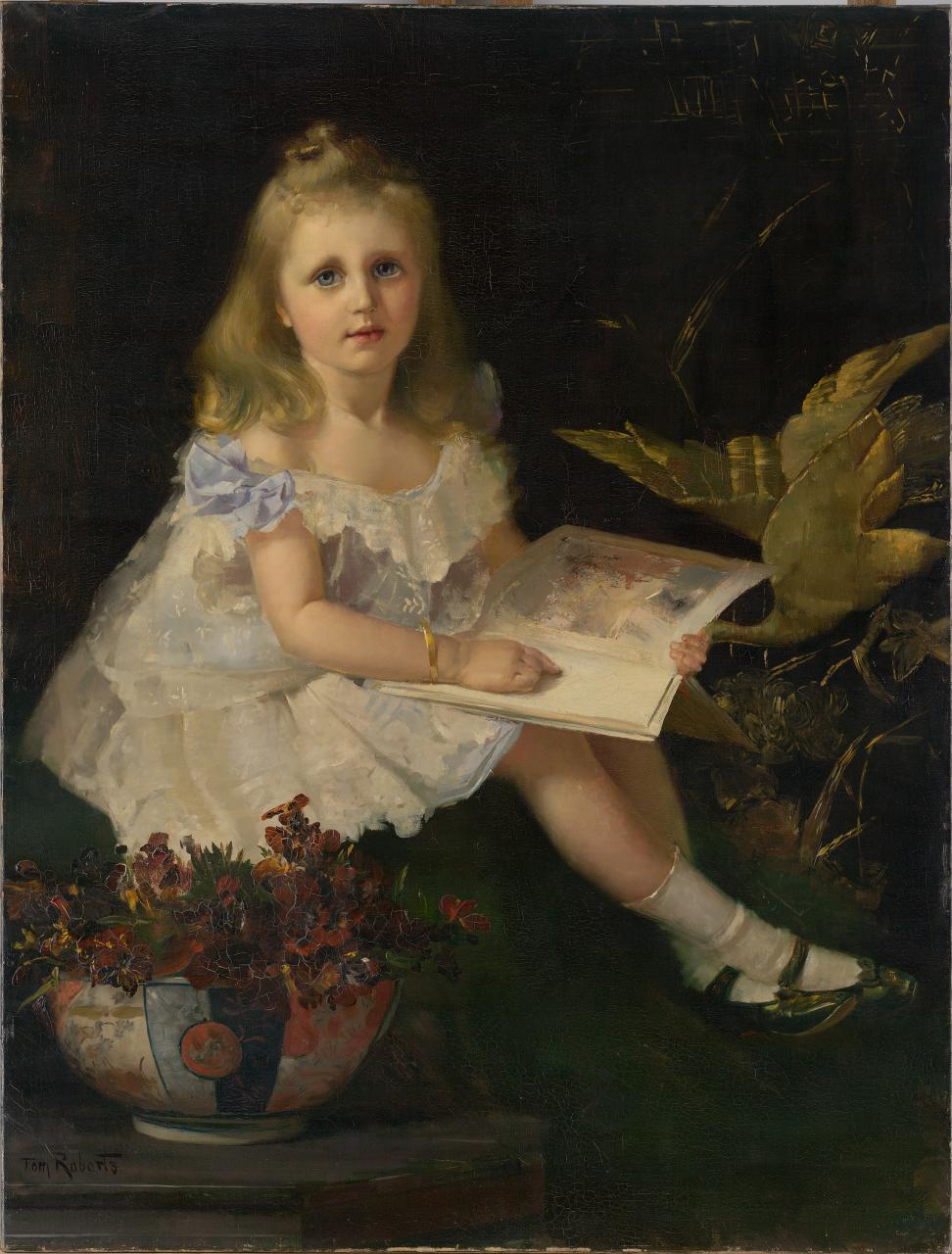
Louise, daughter of the Hon. L. L. Smith by Tom Roberts, 1888

== Legacy ==
Jeff Hanson remarried and, when he died in 1971, his widow Margarita continued running Éditions de l'Oiseau-Lyre till 1996. In 1986, Margarita left the collection of early European music, Classical imprints, manuscripts and scores to Melbourne University.

Jim Davidson's biography of Hanson-Dyer, Lyrebird Rising, was published in 1994. A volume of essays on Hanson-Dyer, Pursuit of the New, was issued in 2023, in advance of an exhibition at the Holst Museum in Cheltenham, which runs from June to December 2024. The University of Melbourne Music Library was renamed Louise Hanson-Dyer Music Library in her honour and the university founded Lyrebird Press to continue her work.

Portraits of her by Tom Roberts and W. B. McInnes hang in the National Gallery of Victoria, and at the Presbyterian Ladies' College, Melbourne.

== Sources ==
- Hanson-Dyer, Louise Berta Mosson (1884–1962) at The Australian Women's Register
- Davidson, Jim (1981). "Dyer, Louise Berta (1884–1962)". Australian Dictionary of Biography. Vol. 9. National Centre of Biography, Australian National University. ISBN 978-0-522-84459-7. ISSN 1833-7538. OCLC 70677943.
- Louise Hanson-Dyer Music Library: Rare Collections, University of Melbourne, National Library of Australia (Australian Government Web Archive), Current version
