= Éditions de l'Oiseau-Lyre =

French classical music record label

- Parent company: University of Melbourne (music publisher); Decca Records (record label)
- Founded: 1932
- Founder: Louise Dyer
- Country of origin: France
- Official website: finearts-music.unimelb.edu.au (music publisher) deccaclassics.com (record label)

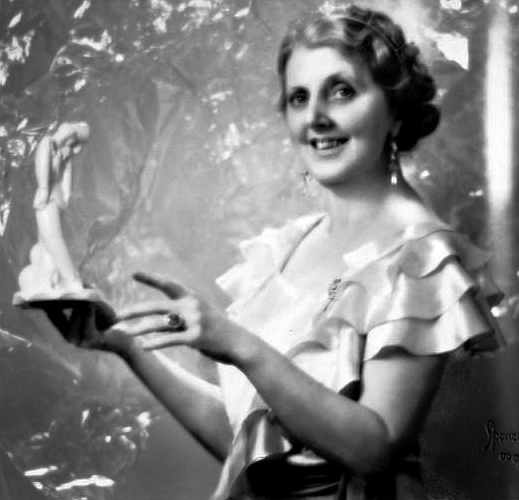
Founder Louise Hanson-Dyer

Éditions de l'Oiseau-Lyre (commonly referred to as L'Oiseau-Lyre) is a French music publishing company and a classical music record label that specialises in Early and Baroque music. It was founded in 1932 as a publisher of scholarly editions of early music that had never been previously published. Its specialist recording arm, developed from the 1960s onwards, grew into a specialist label that is now a part of Decca.

== History ==
The company was financed and established in Paris in 1932 by Louise Dyer (later Hanson-Dyer), an Australian pianist and philanthropist.

Dyer had settled in France two years earlier and energetically amassed a collection of manuscripts and printed music, lyrics and dissertations of the Early, Baroque and Classical music periods. "L'Oiseau-Lyre", the French name for the Australian lyrebird, was chosen by her; the company logo was a representation of the (displaying male) bird's tail.

Dyer's aim was to produce historical editions of European composers of the 15th to 19th Centuries. The first project was an Oeuvres complètes (Complete Works) of François Couperin. No expense was spared in scholarship or printing, and the resulting 12-volume collection was published in 1933, the 200th anniversary of the composer's death. She was appointed chevalier of the Légion d'Honneur in 1934 in recognition of this achievement. She moved the company to Monaco in 1948 after a hiatus attributable to WWII.

Louise died in 1962, and her (second) husband Jeff Hanson continued publication of fine editions, but moved the company's focus to producing high-quality recordings.

Jeff Hanson died the following year but Margarita M. Hanson, his second wife, continued to run the publishing business until 1996. Under her guidance, the 25-volume Polyphonic Music of the Fourteenth Century was published, followed by the Magnus Liber Organi and Le Grand Clavier series, much with the substantial collaboration and financial assistance of the University of Melbourne. Margarita retired in 1995, and control of the company was passed to Davitt Moroney, a harpsichordist and music scholar who had been with the firm since 1981.

Following Davitt Moroney’s departure in 2001, Kenneth Gilbert became Président délégué, bringing the seven-volume Magnus Liber Organi series to conclusion. A number of new editions were also released, including Louis Couperin’s Organ works and revised reprints of earlier Oiseau-Lyre editions.

Les Éditions de l’Oiseau-Lyre ended its presence in Europe in 2013, reverting to the parent holding, Lyrebird Press, at the University of Melbourne.

The Hanson-Dyer collection is now in the Louise Hanson-Dyer Music Library at the University of Melbourne, Australia.

== Record Label ==
The recording arm of Oiseau-Lyre developed by Jeff Hanson produced an extensive catalogue of hundreds of LP records featuring rare and previously unrecorded Early and Baroque music, often performed by young artists. Oiseau-Lyre was the first record company to issue 33 rpm LPs in France. The technical side of the recordings was handled by engineers from the Decca Recording Company. In 1970, Hanson sold the recording branch to Decca, which continued using the Oiseau-Lyre name as their specialised Early music label. Peter Wadland took over as label manager of L'Oiseau-Lyre and developed a recording partnership with the Academy of Ancient Music and Christopher Hogwood (Purcell's theatre music, Mozart's complete symphonies, Beethoven's complete symphonies and piano concertos). Many noted Oiseau-Lyre recordings feature performances by artists on "period instruments", including fortepiano recordings of the Beethoven piano sonatas played by Malcolm Binns, and a number of Renaissance recordings by The Consort of Musicke and Anthony Rooley.
