= List of compositions by Louis Couperin =

This article presents a list of compositions by Louis Couperin.

== Harpsichord music ==
Couperin's harpsichord music was catalogued by musicologist Bruce Gustafson. The same numbering scheme is used in the 1985 Éditions de l'Oiseau-Lyre edition, as well as in the first complete harpsichord works recording, by Davitt Moroney. The Baroque suite was not codified at the time, so French dances are found in manuscripts grouped by tonality. This approach is used here, as well, with some deviations reflecting the diverse nature of the sources.

Gustafson Number	Genre	Title	Key	Sample performances
1	Prélude		D minor	Karen Flint; Rousset; Verlet
2	Prélude		D major	Karen Flint; Leonhardt; Verlet
3	Prélude		G minor	Karen Flint; Rousset; Verlet
4	Prélude		G minor	Karen Flint
5	Prélude		G minor	Karen Flint; Moroney; Verlet
6	Prélude	à l'imitation de Mr. Froberger	A minor	Karen Flint; Sempe; Rousset
7	Prélude		A minor	Karen Flint; Verlet
8	Prélude		A major	Verlet
9	Prélude		C major	Verlet
10	Prélude		C major	Karen Flint
11	Prélude		C major	Rousset
12	Prélude		F major	Verlet
13	Prélude		F major	Rousset; Sempe
14	Prélude		E minor	Moroney; Verlet
15	Allemande		C major	Rousset
16	Courante		C major	Karen Flint
17	Courante		C major	Verlet
18	Courante		C major	Verlet
19	Courante		C major	Rousset
20	Sarabande		C major	Karen Flint
21	Sarabande		C major	Verlet
22	Sarabande		C major	Rousset
23	Sarabande		C major	Karen Flint
24	Sarabande		C major	Verlet
25	Sarabande		C major	
26	Chaconne		C major	Verlet
27	Passacaille	Versailles	C major	Fabrizio; Rousset; Sempe
28	Sarabande		C major	
29	Menuet		C major	
30	Allemande	La précieuse	C minor	Moroney; Rousset
31	Courante		C minor	Rousset
32	Sarabande		C minor	Rousset
33	Gigue		C minor	Rousset
34	Chaconne	La bergeronnette	C minor	Rousset
35	Allemande		D minor	Verlet
36	Allemande		D minor	Moroney; Rousset; Verlet
37		Pièces de trois sorts de mouvements	D minor	Verlet
38	Courante		D minor	
39	Courante		D minor	Verlet
40	Courante		D minor	
41	Courante		D minor	Verlet
42	Courante		D minor	Rousset
43	Courante		D minor	
44	Sarabande		D minor	Moroney; Verlet
45	Sarabande		D minor	
46	Sarabande		D minor	
47	Sarabande	en canon	D minor	Verlet
48	Sarabande		D minor	Verlet
49	Sarabande		D minor	
50	Sarabande		D minor	Verlet
51	Sarabande		D minor	Rousset
52	Canarie		D minor	Laberge; Rousset
53	Volte		D minor	Rousset; Verlet
54		La pastourelle	D minor	Rousset; Verlet
55	Chaconne		D minor	Rousset; Verlet
56	Sarabande		D minor	
57	Chaconne	La complaignante	D minor	Verlet
58	Allemande		D major	Verlet
59	Courante		D major	Verlet
60	Sarabande		D major	Verlet
61	Gaillarde		D major	Leonhardt; Verlet
62	Chaconne		D major	Leonhardt; Moroney; Verlet
63	Allemande	de la paix	E minor	Verlet
64	Courante		E minor	Verlet
65	Sarabande		E minor	Verlet
66	Allemande		F major	
67	Allemande grave		F major	Rousset; Sempe
68	Courante		F major	Rousset
69	Courante		F major	
70	Courante		F major	
71	Courante		F major	
72	Sarabande		F major	Rousset
73	Branle de basque		F major	Rousset
74	Sarabande		F major	
75	Sarabande		F major	
76	Gigue		F major	Rousset
77	Gaillarde		F major	Rousset
78	Chaconne		F major	Rousset
79	Gigue		F major	
80	Chaconne		F major	
81		Tombeau de Monsieur Blancrocher	F major	Leonhardt; Puyana; Rousset; Sempe; van Asperen
82	Allemande		G major	
83	Allemande		G major	
84	Courante		G major	
85	Courante		G major	
86	Courante		G major	
87	Sarabande		G major	
88	Gaillarde		G major	
89	Chaconne		G major	
90	Courante		G major	Verlet
91	Courante		G major	Verlet
92	Courante		G major	Verlet
93	Allemande		G minor	Rousset
94	Courante		G minor	Rousset
95	Sarabande		G minor	Rousset
96		Chaconne ou Passacaille	G minor	Rousset; Verlet
97	Sarabande		G minor	Verlet
98	Passacaille		G minor	Leonhardt
99	Allemande		A minor	Verlet
100	Allemande		A minor	Karen Flint; Verlet
101	Allemande	L'amiable	A minor	Rousset
102		La Piémontoise	A minor	Rousset
103	Courante		A minor	Verlet
104	Courante		A minor	Verlet
105	Courante	La mignonne	A minor	Rousset
106	Courante		A minor	Verlet
107	Sarabande		A minor	Verlet
108	Sarabande		A minor	Verlet
109	Sarabande		A minor	Rousset
110	Sarabande		A minor	Verlet
111	Menuet & double	de Poitou	A minor	Cummings
112	Courante		A major	Verlet
113	Sarabande		A major	Verlet
114	Gigue		A major	Verlet
115	Allemande		B minor	Verlet
116	Courante		B minor	Verlet
117	Sarabande		B minor	Verlet
118	Allemande		B♭ major	
119	Courante		B♭ major	
120	Pavanne		F♯ minor	Puyana; Rousset; Sempe; Verlet
121	Chaconne		G minor	Verlet
122	Gigue		D minor	Verlet
123	-	-	-	-
124	Gavotte		D minor	Verlet
125	Gavotte & double	Gavotte de Mr. Hardel	A minor	Verlet
126	Allemande & double	Le moutier de Mr. de Chambonnières	C major	Allemande de Mr. de Chambonnières: Verlet; Double du Moutier par Mr. Couperin: Verlet
127	Rigaudon & double		C major	
128	Prélude		C minor	Moroney; Rousset
129	Prélude		G major	
130	Gavotte & double	Gavotte de Mr. Le Bègue	C major	
131	Allemande		A minor	Verlet
132	Courante		A minor	Verlet
133	Courante	Autre courante	A minor	Verlet

== Organ music ==
The vast majority of Couperin's organ pieces—the contents of the so-called Oldham manuscript—were unknown until 1957, and remained unpublished until 2003. The numbering in the following list is derived from the Éditions de l'Oiseau-Lyre (OL) edition (Monaco, 2003, 135 p.), the only available as of 2016 (but indefinitely out of print). Many of the pieces in the Oldham manuscript (still unavailable) are inscribed with the date of composition and/or the composer's name; these notices are reproduced here (with respect to the original spelling and punctuation) to facilitate navigation. The order of the pieces is similar to the one in the Oldham manuscript modern edition.

1. Duretez Fantaisie (Couperin le 8e Nov 1650)
2. Fantaisie (Couperin le 15e Novembre 1650)
3. Fugue Grave sur Urbs Beata Jherusalem (Couperin 1654)
4. Autre Fugue Grave sur le mesme subject (A Paris le 15e Octobre 1656)
5. Urbs Beata Jherusalem en Haulte Contre avec le poulce droict ou en trio (Couperin 1657)
6. Conditor en Haultecontre avec le poulce droict en trio (Couperin)
7. Conditor (Couperin a paris le 26e Novembre 1656)
8. Conditor a 2 dessus (Couperin a paris Le 3e Decembre 1656)
9. Ave Maris Stella (Couperin au mois d'Aoust 1658)
10. Ave Maris Stella. Trio (Couperin a paris Le 1er Janvier 1657)
11. Fugue (Couperin a Meudon le 18e Juillet 1656)
12. Fantaisie (Couperin)
13. Fantaisie (Couperin a Meudon le 8e Octobre 1656)
14. Duo (Couperin a Toulouze le unz? Octobre 1659)
15. Fantaisie (Couperin a Paris au mois de Decembre 1656) - also in the Bauyn Manuscript
16. Duo (Couperin) - also in the Bauyn Manuscript
17. Fugue (Couperin a Meudon le 20e Septembre 1656)
18. (Fugue) (Couperin a paris Le 18e Febvrier 1657)
19. Fugue (Couperin a paris le 1er 7bre 1656)
20. Fugue sur le Cromhorne (Couperin a Meudon le 1er Aoust 1656)
21. Fantaisie (Couperin au mois de Mars 1656)
22. Fantaisie (Couperin a paris le 22e May 1656)
23. Fantaisie (Couperin)
24. Fantaisie (Couperin le 8 mai 1656)
25. Fantaisie (Couperin)
26. Fantaisie (Couperin Org de S Gervais le 4e Juillet 1653 a Paris)
27. Fantaisie (Couperin 1654)
28. Fugue (Couperin 1654)
29. Fugue qu’il faut jouer d’un mouvement fort lent sur la tierce du Grand Clavier avec le tremblant lent (Couperin a paris le 14e Mars 1655)
30. Fantaisie (Couperin a paris le 28e Aoust 1655)
31. Ut Queant Laxis (Trio) (Couperin 2e Decembre 1656)
32. Ut Queant Laxis (Trio) (Couperin a Paris au mois de decembre 1656)
33. Iste Confessor (Trio)
34. Pange Lingua en basse (Couperin)
35. Pange Lingua (Trio) (Couperin 1656)
36. Pange Lingua (Couperin 1656)
37. Beata Nobis Gaudia (Couperin a Paris le 22e Janvier 1657)
38. Beata Nobis Gaudia. Trio (Couperin a Paris le 25e Janvier 1657)
39. Jesu Salvator Sæculi (Couperin a Paris le 10e Apvril 1657)
40. Tristes Erant Apostoli (Couperin a Paris le 11e? Apvril 1657)
41. A Solis en Taille (Couperin a Paris le 11e? Apvril 1657)
42. A Solis en Haulte Contre (Couperin)
43. A Solis. Trio (Couperin a paris 1656)
44. A Solis en basse (Couperin 1656)
45. A Solis En triple. A la Haulte Contre (A Toulouze le 5e decembre 1659 - Couperin)
46. Prelude Autre Livre. Grand Livre d’Orgue - "Il faut jouer cecy d'un Mouvemen fort lent" (Couperin 1654)
47. Fantaisie (Couperin 1651)
48. Fantaisie (Couperin a paris le 12e Aoust 1651)
49. Fantaisie (Couperin 1654)
50. Regina Coeli (Couperin)
51. Invitatoire pour le Jour de Pasques (Couperin)
52. Invitatoire de la Trinité (Couperin)
53. Invitatoire de la Feste Dieu (Couperin)
54. Ad Coenam Agni Providi comme il se chante au Montmartre (Couperin)
55. (Ad Coenam Agni Providi) 3e Verset (Couperin)
56. Fantaisie 2me Livre (Couperin a paris le 3e May 1656)
57. Fantaisie sur le Cromhorne (Couperin 1655 au mois de Septembre)
58. Fantaisie sur la tierce du Grand Clavier (Couperin)
59. Fantaisie (Couperin a Paris le 15e may 1656)
60. Fugue Renversée (Couperin a paris le 15e Juillet 1656)
61. Fugue (Couperin a paris le 22e Juillet 1656)
62. Fugue (Couperin a Meudon le 4e octobre 1656)
63. Fugue sur la tierce du Grand Clavier (Couperin a paris le 6e Octobre 1656)
64. Fugue sur la tierce (Couperin a Paris le 15e Novembre 1657)
65. Fugue sur le Cromhorne (Couperin Commencée a Meudon & achevée a paris au mois de Novembre 1658)
66. Fantaisie (Couperin le 8e Octobre Mil six cent cinquante)
67. Fantaisie (le 15e octobre 1651, a paris Couperin)
68. Fantaisie (Au mois de Novembre 1655 - Couperin)
69. Fantaisie (Couperin)
70. Fantaisie (Couperin a Meudon 1656)

2 Carillons (for All Saints vespers) in : "Recueil de plusieurs vieux Airs faits aux Sacres, Couronnements, Mariages et autres Solennitez, faits sous les Règnes de François Ier, Henry 3, Henry 4 et Louis 13. Avec plusieurs Concerts faits pour leurs divertissement(s). Recueillis par Philidor l’Aisné en 1690".

== Other works ==
- 2 fantasies for 2 viols
- 1 simphonie, for one instrument and basso continuo
- 2 symphonies, for two instruments and basso continuo
- 2 fantasies à 5 for shawm band
- 2 fantasies à 5 (for strings?)

== Scores ==
- Free scores by Louis Couperin at the International Music Score Library Project (IMSLP)
