= Electoral results for the district of Wangaratta and Ovens =

Australian district election results

This is a list of electoral results for the electoral district of Wangaratta and Ovens in Victorian state elections.

== Members for Wangaratta and Ovens ==
Member	Party	Term
John Bowser	Country	1927–1929
Lot Diffey	Country	1929–1945

== Election results ==
=== Elections in the 1940s ===
1943 Victorian state election: Wangaratta and Ovens
Party	Candidate	Votes	%	±%
Country	Lot Diffey	6,478	66.5	−7.3
Labor	Charles McKissack	3,263	33.5	+33.5
Total formal votes		9,741	98.9	+0.2
Informal votes		108	1.1	−0.2
Turnout		9,849	87.0	−5.6
Country hold		Swing	N/A	

1940 Victorian state election: Wangaratta and Ovens
Party	Candidate	Votes	%	±%
Country	Lot Diffey	7,700	73.8	−26.2
Liberal Country	Rupert Whalley	2,727	26.2	+26.2
Total formal votes		10,427	98.7	
Informal votes		141	1.3	
Turnout		10,568	92.6	
Country hold		Swing	N/A	

=== Elections in the 1930s ===
1937 Victorian state election: Wangaratta and Ovens
Party	Candidate	Votes	%	±%
Country	Lot Diffey	unopposed		
Country hold		Swing		

1935 Victorian state election: Wangaratta and Ovens
Party	Candidate	Votes	%	±%
Country	Lot Diffey	5,601	53.6	−46.4
Labor	Paul Jones	4,853	46.4	+46.4
Total formal votes		10,454	99.1	
Informal votes		93	0.9	
Turnout		10,547	94.1	
Country hold		Swing	N/A	

1932 Victorian state election: Wangaratta and Ovens
Party	Candidate	Votes	%	±%
Country	Lot Diffey	unopposed		
Country hold		Swing		

=== Elections in the 1920s ===
1929 Victorian state election: Wangaratta and Ovens
Party	Candidate	Votes	%	±%
Labor	Clive Walker	3,428	38.3	+38.3
Country	Lot Diffey	2,821	31.6	−30.8
Country Progressive	William Higgins	1,375	15.4	+15.4
Independent Country	Percival Inchbold	1,313	14.7	+14.7
Total formal votes		8,937	98.7	+1.9
Informal votes		114	1.3	−1.9
Turnout		9,051	95.1	+3.1
Two-party-preferred result
Country	Lot Diffey	4,869	54.5	+1.3
Labor	Clive Walker	4,068	45.5	+45.5
Country hold		Swing	N/A	

1927 Victorian state election: Wangaratta and Ovens
Party	Candidate	Votes	%	±%
Country	John Bowser	3,221	38.8	
Australian Liberal	William Higgins	3,116	37.6	
Country	Lot Diffey	1,953	23.6	
Total formal votes		8,290	96.8	
Informal votes		271	3.2	
Turnout		8,561	92.0	
Two-candidate-preferred result
Country	John Bowser	4,409	53.2	
Australian Liberal	William Higgins	3,881	46.8	
Country hold		Swing		
