= Harold Gengoult Smith =

Australian medical practitioner

Sir Harold Gengoult Smith
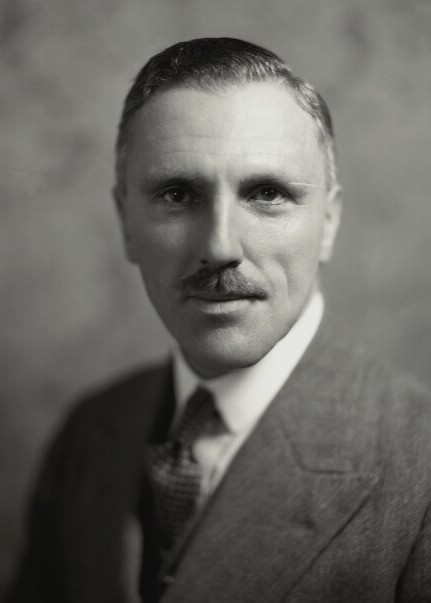

Lord Mayor of Melbourne
- In office 9 November 1931 – 9 November 1934
- Preceded by: Harold Luxton
- Succeeded by: George Wales

Personal details
- Born: 25 July 1890 East Melbourne, Victoria, Australia
- Died: 14 April 1983 (aged 92) Armadale, Victoria, Australia

Sir Harold Gengoult Smith (25 July 1890 – 14 April 1983) was an Australian medical practitioner who served as Lord Mayor of Melbourne from 1931 to 1934.

Smith was born in Melbourne to Marion Jane (née Higgins) and Louis Lawrence Smith, both English immigrants. His father was a doctor and member of parliament, while his sister was the musical publisher Louise Hanson-Dyer. Smith attended Melbourne Grammar School and then moved to Scotland to study medicine. However, his studies were interrupted by the war and he instead enlisted in the British Army, serving in France with the 2nd Dragoon Guards. Smith eventually received his qualifications in medicine in 1917. He subsequently returned to Australia and began practising at his father's chambers on Collins Street.

In 1921, Smith was elected to the Melbourne City Council. After the retirement of Harold Luxton, he defeated J. J. Liston by a single vote in the lord-mayoral election. In 1933, Smith married Cynthia Brookes, the daughter of tennis player Sir Norman Brookes. Their wedding at St Paul's Cathedral was one of the events of the year. As lord mayor, Smith chaired many of the organising committees for the 1934 Centenary of Melbourne. He originated the idea of the MacRobertson Air Race to draw international attention to the city, and convinced Macpherson Robertson to sponsor it. As part of the centenary, Cooks' Cottage and the Shrine of Remembrance were unveiled.

Smith retired as lord mayor at the end of 1934 (and received a knighthood), but remained on the city council until 1965, being the longest-serving councillor in the city's history. At the 1940 state election, he was the unsuccessful candidate in the electorate of Mornington, representing the United Australia Party. During World War II, Smith was a lieutenant-colonel in the Australian Army Medical Corps and commanded several medical units. He died at the age of 92.
