= Charles Francis (politician) =

Australian politician

Charles Hugh Francis AM RFD QC (15 July 1924 – 14 August 2009) was an Australian lawyer and politician.

== Early life, education, and career ==
Francis was born in Belgrave to medical practitioner Shirley Elliston Francis and Constance Mary Varley.

He was educated at Belgrave Grammar and Camberwell Grammar completing his schooling as a boader at Melbourne Grammar School in 1942 before studying at the University of Melbourne, where he received bachelor's degrees of Arts, Law and Commerce.

During World War II he served in the Royal Australian Air Force as an air-gunner, and later became a Group Captain.

Francis was a barrister from 1949. He took silk in 1969, and from 1969 to 1979 was judge advocate with the Royal Australian Air Force Reserve.

From 1974 to 1976 he was aide-de-camp to the Queen Elizabeth II, and he was also president of the Australian Military Law Society from 1974.

A former chairman of the Victorian Bar (1987-1988), he also served on the Australian Bar Association Council (1987-89). He was a former Vice-Chairman of the Criminal Bar Association (1983-84) and from 1989 served on the Common Law Bar Association Committee.lawyer

Francis wrote numerous papers on legal history and human rights. In 1997, he was Co-Chairman of the Committee in Prague, which prepared the Declaration of the World Congress of Families. He spoke frequently on human rights issues, on euthanasia, on UN Conventions, and lectured in the USA, Canada, England, New Zealand, Switzerland and Ireland.

In August 1999, Francis convened the Australian Regional Conference of the World Congress of Families II in Melbourne, Australia.

He frequently appeared as defence counsel for pro-life persons prosecuted for standing and praying outside abortion clinics and also acted in many other pro-life cases.

He retired in 2002 and was appointed a Member of the Order of Australia in the 2003 Australia Day Honours for service to the law.

== Political Career ==
A member of the Liberal Party, Francis was chairman of the Monash electoral committee from 1969 to 1975, and president of the Stonnington branch from 1970 to 1973.

In 1976 he was elected to the Victorian Legislative Assembly as the member for Caulfield.

In September 1977 he was expelled from the Liberal Party after he abstained from a no-confidence motion over Housing Commission land deals. He remained in the Assembly as an Independent Liberal, but was defeated running for re-election in 1979.

In 1983 he was founding president of the Toorak-Malvern branch of the National Party.

== Personal Life and Death ==
On 28 October 1953, he married Babette Avita Saldanha, with whom he had eight children.

Charles Francis died in 2009.

Victorian Legislative Assembly
Preceded by Edgar Tanner	Member for Caulfield; 1976–1979	Succeeded by Ted Tanner
