= Michael Danby =

Australian politician

The Honourable Michael Danby
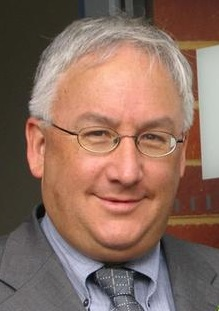

Member of the Australian Parliament for Melbourne Ports
- In office 3 October 1998 – 11 April 2019
- Preceded by: Clyde Holding
- Succeeded by: Division abolished

Personal details
- Born: 16 February 1955 (age 71) Melbourne, Victoria, Australia
- Party: Labor
- Spouse: Amanda Mendes da Costa
- Children: 2
- Occupation: Consultant

Michael David Danby (born 16 February 1955) is an Australian politician who was an Australian Labor Party member of the Australian House of Representatives from 1998 until 2019, representing the Division of Melbourne Ports, Victoria. Danby was briefly Parliamentary Secretary for the Arts, from March to September 2013.

== Early life and experience ==
Danby was born in Melbourne and lives in Elwood. Danby attended Mount Scopus Memorial College and then enrolled in a Bachelor of Arts at Melbourne University but left without completing the degree. He was President of the Melbourne University Student Union as well as President of the Australasian Union of Jewish Students. From 1980 to 1983 he was an Australian Army Reserve officer cadet with Officer Cadet Training Unit, 3 Training Group, based at Albert Park Reserve and Puckapunyal.

From 1979 to 1983 Danby was manager of Halmaag Art Galleries in Malvern. He was Assistant Private Secretary to Barry Cohen, a minister in the Hawke government 1983–84, and Editor of the Australia-Israel Review (published by the Australia/Israel & Jewish Affairs Council) from 1986 to 1993. In 1985 he was senior vice-president of the International Youth Conference in Kingston, Jamaica. He was a ministerial adviser to Alan Griffiths, the Industry Minister in the Keating government, 1993–94. He was an industrial officer with the Shop, Distributive and Allied Employees' Association 1994–96.

== Federal politics ==
In 1990 Danby ran as the Labor candidate for the safe Liberal seat of Goldstein against Dr David Kemp. In 1997 he won a hotly disputed Labor Party preselection battle for the right to contest Melbourne Ports, where the sitting member, Clyde Holding, was retiring, defeating Tim Pallas, who would later become the Victorian State Treasurer. He was elected in 1998 with 55 percent of the vote, and was reelected with slightly reduced majorities in 2001 and 2004. In 2007 he gained a 3% two-candidate-preferred (TCP) swing to Labor and in 2010 secured a further 1% TCP swing. Danby was outspoken in his criticism of the Labor Party's handling of the 2010 election, attacking the heavily-Western Sydney focus of the campaign.

=== Electoral Matters Committee activities ===
Danby was a member of the Parliament's Joint Standing Committee on Electoral Matters from 1998 until 2010, and was deputy chair in 2006. He used this position to run a campaign against the Howard Government's changes to Australian electoral law, which he argued restricted the ability of voters, particularly new voters, to enrol and vote. In an article in 2005, he wrote: "For 150 years Australia has been a world leader in progressive electoral reform... As a result Australia has one of the most open and accessible electoral systems in the world, and also a system with the highest reputation for integrity and transparency. Now, for the first time in living memory, an Australian government is going to wind the process back, for no good reason other than its own partisan advantage. They are going to make it more difficult for Australians to enrol and to vote." Soon after the 2010 Federal Election Danby drew attention to the fact that for various reasons 1.4 million eligible Australians had not voted, and criticised the Government for not having acted during its previous term to ensure greater voter turn-out.

=== Other parliamentary activities ===
From 2008 to 2010 Danby was Chair of the Parliament's Joint Standing Committee on Migration. He was Chair of the Foreign Affairs Sub-Committee of the Joint Standing Committee on Foreign Affairs, Defence and Trade throughout the 42nd Parliament, and was again chosen for this position in the 43rd parliament. He was also Chair of the Parliamentary Friendship Group for the United States, and the Parliamentary Group for Tibet.

In 2008 and 2009 the Migration Committee completed three major reports. These reports made numerous recommendations in relation to Australia's immigration detention system, several of which of were adopted by the Australian Government, including the recommendation that 'detention debt' should be abolished. Danby gained some media attention in late 2009 following his criticism of Prime Minister Kevin Rudd's use of the term 'illegal immigrants' rather than 'asylum seekers'. Regarding use of the term 'illegal immigrants' he stated "I don't find these sort of populist expressions helpful in this debate."

In July 2009 in his role as Chair of the Parliamentary Group for Tibet, Danby led the first-ever delegation of Australian MPs and Senators to Dharamshala, India, the base of the Central Tibetan Administration. The group met with Dalai Lama, and other senior lamas, as well as numerous government Ministers. Danby also gave a speech at the celebrations for the Dalai Lama's 74th birthday entitled 'Let freedom reign in Tibet'. The Chinese Government reacted angrily to the delegation's visit, saying the visit constituted interference in China's internal affairs.

From July 2011 to March 2013 Danby was Chairman of the Parliamentary Joint Committee on Foreign Affairs, Defence and Trade, a role which saw him represent the Prime Minister at the inauguration of the new nation of South Sudan in 2011.

=== Jewish representation ===
Danby was the only Jewish member of the Australian Parliament from 1998 to 2007, when Mark Dreyfus, also from the Labor Party, was elected. This was followed in 2010 with the election of Josh Frydenberg who is a Liberal. He has frequently spoken in support of Israel. Danby supports a two-state solution to the Israel-Palestine question. In May 2011 he said: "I am a strong supporter of Israel. Obviously also a strong supporter of a peace process there and a two-state solution, and I have that dialogue with a friends from Israel when I get the opportunity to.

In 2005 Danby was critical of a book by a Sydney Jewish atheist journalist, Antony Loewenstein, about the Australian Jewish community and its attitudes to the Israeli–Palestinian conflict. In a letter to the Australian Jewish News, Danby called on the book's publisher, Melbourne University Press, to "drop this whole disgusting project." He also called on the Jewish community to boycott the book. "I urge the Australian Jewish community, and particularly the Australian Jewish News, to treat it with dignified silence," he said.

=== Other activities ===
Danby was an outspoken supporter of the Australian National Academy of Music, opposing Arts Minister Peter Garrett's decision to cut funding for the institution, which is in his electorate, in October 2008. Following a wide outcry the Government changed its decision to close the academy and announced an additional $500,000 for the elite classical training centre.

Danby helped organise the visit of the Uyghur leader Rebiya Kadeer, to Australia for the Melbourne International Film Festival in August 2009. The visit drew condemnation from the Chinese Government, but Danby criticised the Chinese Government for describing Kadeer as a terrorist, and argued that she was "a paradigm of non-violence".

In September and October 2010 Danby wrote a number of articles critical of Australian National University academic Hugh White's Quarterly Essay entitled "Power Shift: Australia's Future between Washington and Beijing'". In an article published in The Wall Street Journal Asia, Danby was highly critical of White's contention that Australia should support US military evacuation of the South China Sea, and other possible zones of conflict with China. In another article in The Australian (co-authored with foreign affairs experts Carl Ungerer and Peter Khalil), Danby warned against a 'Munich Moment' which would result if Australia followed White's advice and decided that the price of China's growing power was to cease "lecturing China about dissidents, Tibet or religious freedom". White responded to these articles in both The Australian and the Australian Financial Review. However it seems Danby had the last word in the debate, publishing another article in the Australian Financial Review, which attacked White's thesis as advocating "unprincipled appeasement". Danby also accused White of holding 'cold-blooded, Kissingerian views', 'treating China and the United States as if they were no more than a pair of traditional great-power rivals competing for territory or markets, like the Habsburg and Ottoman Empires'. In a parliamentary speech in October 2010 Danby pointed to calls for reform from within the highest echelons of the Chinese Communist Party as reason not to follow White's approach.

During his time in Parliament, Danby was a member of the World Movement for Democracy's Steering Committee.

=== Retirement ===
On 5 July 2018, Danby announced he would not contest the seat of Macnamara, which would replace Melbourne Ports at the 2019 federal election, thus ending a 20-year career in federal politics. Danby was replaced by Josh Burns, a Labor staffer, who went on to win the seat.

== Controversies ==
=== Preferencing tactics ===
During the mid-2010s, Melbourne Ports saw an increase in the Greens vote. Danby has long been critical of the Greens due to their stance on Israel, which he characterised as "extreme."

In the 2016 federal election campaign, Danby criticised Greens candidate Steph Hodgins-May for pulling out of a local debate after discovering it was co-hosted by Zionism Victoria; Hodgins-May was critical of the organisation's political views, specifically its dismissive attitude of the United Nations, her former employer. In response Danby called her an "obnoxious bigot" and called on Greens leader Richard Di Natale to sack her. The debate ultimately went ahead between Danby and Liberal candidate Owen Guest, with Hodgins-May represented by an empty chair.

During the campaign Danby was discovered distributing how-to-vote cards which preferenced the Greens below the Liberals, in contravention of official Labor Party cards, which preferenced the Liberals below the Greens. The Greens unequivocally preferenced Labor.

Danby previously drew criticism in the 2013 federal election for distributing how-to-vote cards which placed the Australian Sex Party last when distributed to Jewish Orthodox voters, in contravention of official Labor Party cards which placed Family First last.

=== Advertisements regarding an ABC journalist ===
In October 2017 Danby ran attack ads in the Australian Jewish News against Sophie McNeill, the ABC's Walkley Award-winning Jerusalem correspondent. Danby accused McNeill of pro-Palestinian bias and double standards, alleging that she filed "extensive coverage" on the September 2017 eviction of the Shamasneh family from East Jerusalem, while falsely claiming she provided "no report" on the July 2017 Halamish stabbing attack. The ABC strongly rejected the allegation, calling the ads "part of a pattern of inaccurate and highly inappropriate personal attacks on Ms McNeill by Mr Danby," and complaining directly to Labor leader Bill Shorten. Danby stood by his claims, asserting that McNeill gave the Shamasneh family's eviction undue prominence over the Halamish attack. Danby faced further criticism when it emerged the ads had been paid for with taxpayer money, amounting to $4,574.

Labor leader Bill Shorten was reported to be "deeply unimpressed" by Danby's actions, and former Labor New South Wales Premier and foreign minister Bob Carr called the ad "wild, nasty and tinged by mania." The incident further stoked a push by factions within the Labor Party to pressure Danby into retirement ahead of the next election, with sources saying Danby was "too divisive to resist the Liberals and the Greens."

=== Israeli conference appearance ===
Shortly after the controversy surrounding his attack ad, it was revealed Danby had attended a conference on "global jihad" and the "terrorist threat posed to Israel and other democratic countries" hosted by the conservative International Institute for Counter-Terrorism along with other meetings in Tel Aviv, Israel while the House of Representatives was sitting, after having presented a medical certificate and obtaining sick leave. Labor factional ally and former New South Wales Premier and foreign minister Bob Carr again criticised Danby, writing on Twitter "pre-selectors and voters in Melbourne Ports [are] itching to give Michael Danby what he sought: a long break to look after his health." Catherine King, a fellow Labor MP suggested it was a matter for Danby "to address and explain himself".

=== Farewell party expenses ===
Following Danby's retirement, mayor of the City of Port Phillip Dick Gross alleged Danby's staffers never paid invoices of several thousand dollars for the rental of St Kilda Town Hall. Danby claimed the use of the venue was a gift due to his "wide local community support."

=== Migrants ===
In 2011, Israeli politician Danny Danon who is an opponent of immigration from Africa to Israel, said that the "arrival of thousands of Muslim infiltrators to Israeli territory is a clear threat to the state's Jewish identity." Danon lobbied Danby to propose, in parliament in Canberra, sending African migrants from Israel to Australia.

== Electoral history ==
Danby has run in two seats through his career, both for federal parliament, across eight elections.

	Electorate	Primary vote	Change in primary vote from previous election	2 party preferred	Opponent 2PP	Name of Liberal opponent
1990	Goldstein	29.8%	-10.2%	44.0%	56.0%	David Kemp
1998	Melbourne Ports	44.10%	-2.47%	55.83%	44.17%	Fiona Snedden
2001	Melbourne Ports	39.36%	-4.74%	55.69%	44.31%	Andrew McLorinan
2004	Melbourne Ports	39.25%	-0.11%	53.74%	46.36%	David Southwick
2007	Melbourne Ports	42.47%	+3.22%	57.15%	42.85%	Adam Held
2010	Melbourne Ports	38.19%	-4.28%	57.56%	42.44%	Kevin Ekendahl
2013	Melbourne Ports	31.67%	-6.52%	53.56%	46.44%	Kevin Ekendahl
2016	Melbourne Ports	27.00%	-4.67%	51.38%	48.62%	Owen Guest

== Personal life ==
In February 2008 he and his longtime partner, barrister Amanda Mendes da Costa, were married at Parliament House, Canberra, the first Jewish wedding held in the building.

Parliament of Australia
Preceded by Clyde Holding	Member for Melbourne Ports; 1998–2019	Division abolished
