= Josh Burns (politician) =

Australian politician (born 1987)

Josh Burns MP
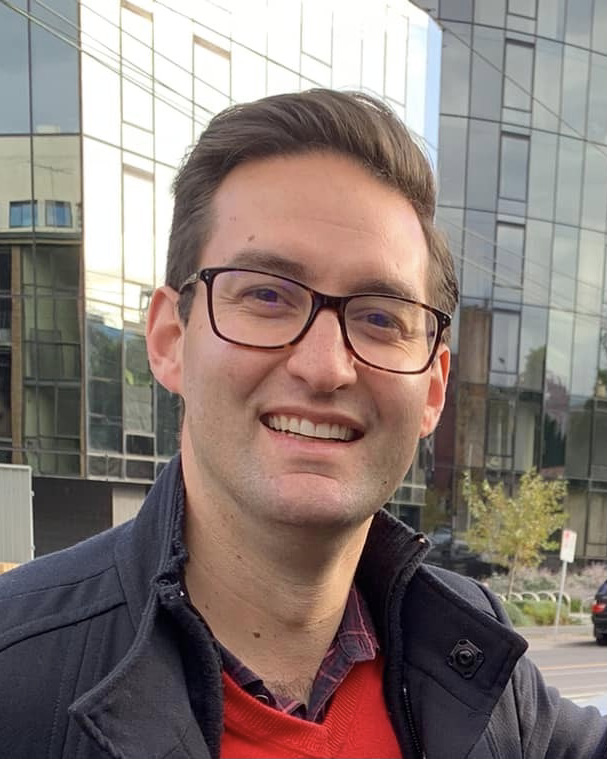
- Burns in 2022

Member of the Australian Parliament
- Incumbent
- Assumed office 18 May 2019
- Constituency: Macnamara

Personal details
- Born: Joshua Solomon Burns; 6 February 1987 (age 39) Caulfield, Victoria, Australia
- Party: Labor
- Education: Mt Scopus Memorial College; Monash University (BA)
- Partner: Georgie Purcell (2024–present)
- Website: joshburns.com.au

Joshua Solomon Burns (born 6 February 1987) is an Australian politician. Representing the Australian Labor Party, he was elected as the member for the division of Macnamara in Melbourne at the 2019 Australian federal election. He was re-elected in 2022 and 2025.

== Early life ==
Burns was born and raised in Caulfield, Victoria. His maternal grandmother came to Australia as a Jewish refugee from Nazi Germany. His paternal grandfather was born in London and came to Australia via Israel, while his paternal grandmother was born in Scotland. His grandfather fought in the 1948 Arab–Israeli War. He was educated at Gardenvale Primary School and Mt Scopus Memorial College, a Jewish day school. He then went to Monash University, where he initially studied commerce, before switching to politics and history. In his youth, Burns was a chair of the Melbourne SKIF, the youth wing of the Australian Jewish Labour Bund. His mother was also been raised in the movement; likewise, his father was raised in Hashomer Hatzair.

Burns worked in a number of jobs prior to his election to parliament, including years working with a publishing company. He was a staffer for Labor federal MP Michael Danby, and from 2014 to 2019 worked as a senior adviser to the premier of Victoria, Daniel Andrews.

== Career ==
Burns ran as the Labor candidate for the seat of Caulfield in the 2014 Victorian state election and gained a 4.9-point swing against Liberal incumbent David Southwick.

At the 2019 federal election, Burns contested the new seat of Macnamara, whose boundaries were almost identical to Melbourne Ports, following the retirement of Michael Danby, who had been the MP for Melbourne Ports since 1998.

Burns was preselected as the Labor candidate for the seat in 2018. The preselection process was controversial, with a number of members claiming that Danby invited only a fraction of the members of the branch. The unsuccessful candidate, Mary Delahunty accused the branch of working against her because she was the only woman and only non Jewish person running for preselection.

The election was considered to be a three-cornered contest as both the Liberal Party and the Greens viewed themselves as a realistic chance of winning the seat from Labor. At the election Burns increased Labor's primary vote and won the seat with a two-party-preferred swing of 5.04 points in his favour, against Liberal candidate Kate Ashmor.

Burns serves as a member of the Parliament's Joint Statutory Committee on Human Rights and on the House of Representatives Standing Committees on Environment and Energy and Communications and the Arts.

In 2020, Victorian state MLC Adem Somyurek was expelled from the Labor Party after accusations of branch stacking. Somyurek claimed that Burns was among those Labor MPs who "offer him fealty and can expect his protection in return." Burns denied the claim and there was no record of Burns being involved in Somyurek's schemes.

In 2022, he was reelected as MP for the division of Macnamara. He sought reelection for a third term at the 2025 Australian federal election. Following his reelection in the 2025 federal election, Burns was named Special Envoy for Social Housing and Homelessness in the second Albanese ministry.

== Political views and positions ==
Burns is a member of the Labor Right faction.

Burns has been a strong advocate for addressing climate change within the Labor caucus, and has criticised Labor colleague Joel Fitzgibbon for urging Labor to be less ambitious on climate action.

Burns has also been an advocate for refugees, moving a motion in parliament urging the government to free refugees being held in onshore and offshore detention.

Burns has called for Australia to significantly increase its supply of public and social housing, and enshrine housing as a human right, in a research paper published by The McKell Institute.

Burns is a strong supporter of Medicare, Australia's universal healthcare scheme and supports the increased use of bulk billing for GP visits.

In 2021, Burns called for the date of Australia Day to change, arguing it was a divisive date given it marks the beginning of atrocities committed against Indigenous Australians. Burns called for the date to be changed following the implementation of an Indigenous reconciliation and recognition referendum and an Australian republic referendum.

=== Antisemitism and Israel–Palestine conflict ===
Burns supports the working definition of antisemitism developed by the International Holocaust Remembrance Alliance (IHRA). In 2022 he became one of the inaugural co-chairs of the Parliament Friends of IHRA working group, along with Julian Leeser and Allegra Spender. The following year he moved a motion in the House of Representatives reaffirming the chamber's commitment to the IHRA definition and criticising the Greens for their failure to support the definition.

Burns supports a two-state solution to the Israeli–Palestinian conflict and has stated that he "desperately want[s] to see a peace agreement signed between the Israelis and the Palestinians" in his lifetime. In October 2022, he publicly criticised the Albanese government for its decision to revoke Australia's recognition of Jerusalem as capital of Israel. He stated the government had rushed into changing its position and that he was "hurt" by the decision. He supports the retention of the Western Wall within Israel.

Following the October 7 attack in 2023 and the resulting Gaza war, Burns stated that antisemitism in Australia was "certainly the worst in my lifetime", later stating that "this has been probably the most difficult period that I can think of in my lifetime to be a Jewish person in Australia". Burns visited Israel in December 2023 as part of a cross-party delegation sponsored by AIJAC. He opposed an immediate ceasefire in the Gaza war on the grounds that it would give Hamas time to regroup. He opposed the government's decision to vote in favour of United Nations General Assembly Resolution ES-10/22.

In February 2024, he condemned the 2024 J.E.W.I.S.H creatives and academics doxxing incident: "You are targeting your fellow Australian citizens. And you cannot do that because all Australians should be able to live their lives respectfully and free from intimidation and free from the sort of really ugly vilification that we've seen against Jewish community members." Burns also supported the Federal Government's move to outlaw doxxing. He also condemned The Greens NSW politician, Jenny Leong for "a blatant antisemitic statement" and the silence of her colleagues in the party.

During the 2024 pro-Palestinian protests on university campuses, he was reportedly the first Labor MP to publicly call for police intervention in the protests. In April 2024 Burns' office was vandalised and daubed with anti-Zionist graffiti, causing more than $100,000 worth of damage. Burns has described it as "an escalation of the rising antisemitism my community had been warning about." As Chair of Victoria's Parliamentary Joint Commission on Human Rights he spearheaded an investigation into antisemitism at university campuses and chaired the inquiry. The ALP led inquiry found that "brazen antisemitism" had been overlooked by universities, causing Jewish students to feel unsafe on campus. It also highlighted a lack of consistent policies nationwide.

In December 2024, he strongly condemned the 2024 Melbourne synagogue attack, an arson terrorist attack which took place at Adass Israel Synagogue of Melbourne in Ripponlea: "The attack on their synagogue overnight is a disgrace. It is antisemitism, it is racism and it needs to stop...The sight of a burnt synagogue and shattered windows is reminiscent of the worst time in Jewish collective memory." In March 2025, Burns announced the Federal Government's pledge to rebuild the synagogue and a commitment to security upgrades.

== Personal life ==
He lives in St Kilda, an inner seaside suburb in Melbourne.

As of July 2024, Burns is in a relationship with Victorian Animal Justice Party MP Georgie Purcell. In July 2025, the couple announced that they are expecting a daughter. He has one daughter and was previously married. He is a vegetarian.

He is 184 cm tall and played basketball for Maccabi Australia for 25 years.

Burns was diagnosed with Attention deficit hyperactivity disorder (ADHD) in 2026.

Parliament of Australia
Division created	Member for Macnamara; 2019–present	Incumbent
