= Alexander Dennett =

Australian politician

Alexander Henry Dennett (6 January 1903 – 4 December 1956) was an Australian politician.

Dennett was born in Melbourne to John Dennett and Dorothy Neale and became an Anglican lay preacher in Gippsland before serving in World War I. On his return he became a journalist, working first for the Star and then for the Argus. On 4 November 1922 he married Henrietta Jean Mathieson, with whom he had two children. During World War II he served in the Middle East and the Pacific, and received the rank of lieutenant-colonel.

On 10 November 1945 Dennett was elected to the Victorian Legislative Assembly as the Liberal member for Caulfield. He was party whip from 1945 to 1947, when he became Minister of Agriculture and Forests. He briefly held the Labour and Decentralisation portfolios in December 1948, and remained on the front bench until 1950. A supporter of Thomas Hollway, he was the deputy of the Liberal rebels who broke away from the Liberal and Country Party in 1952 to vote against the McDonald Country Party government.

Dennett was Deputy Premier and Minister of Forests, Conservation and Immigration in the seventy-hour Hollway ministry that followed that action, and served as deputy of the group that became the Victorian Liberal Party until 1955, when he lost his seat.

Dennett died at Heidelberg on 4 December 1956.

Victorian Legislative Assembly
Preceded by Andrew Hughes	Member for Caulfield; 1945–1955	Succeeded by Joe Rafferty
