= Andrew Hughes (politician) =

Australian politician

Andrew Arthur Hughes

Member for Caulfield in the Victorian Legislative Assembly
- In office 12 June 1943 – 10 November 1945
- Preceded by: Harold Cohen
- Succeeded by: Alexander Dennett

Personal details
- Born: 21 January 1902 South Yarra, Victoria, Australia
- Died: 1 July 1996 (aged 94)
- Spouses: Eleanor Wynne Morris (m. 1926) Tomoko Matsuda (m. 1963)
- Children: 5
- Education: College of the Bible, Glen Iris, Victoria
- Occupation: Missionary
- Profession: Minister

Andrew Arthur Hughes (21 January 1902 – 1 July 1996) was an Australian politician.

Born in South Yarra to brickmaker George Alfred Hughes and Eliza Smartt, Hughes attended Brighton State School and then the College of the Bible in Glen Iris. He became a minister of religion, and spent the years from February 1926 to 1933 as a missionary for the Church of Christ in India. On his return Hughes became a probation officer with the Children's Courts. In the 1930s he was president of the Victorian Christian Endeavour Union. In 1939 he became minister of the Church of Christ in Swanston Street. In November 1941 he was elected chaplain to the Melbourne Boys' Club Association. In 1946 he was president of Opportunity Clubs for Boys and Girls, and of the Australia-India Association.

On 12 June 1943, he was elected to the seat of Caulfield in the Victorian Legislative Assembly as an Independent, serving until his defeat in 1945. He joined the Labor Party in 1946 and was preselected to contest the federal seat of Flinders in 1949, but the state executive refused to endorse his candidature and expelled him after he stood as an Independent Labor candidate. He was readmitted to the ALP in 1955 and contested the federal seat of Higgins, a conservative seat held by the government minister, and future prime minister, Harold Holt. He moved to Japan in 1957 to teach and worked for Japan Council against A & H Bombs from 1958, becoming highly active in the Japanese anti-war movement.

On 15 July 1926 he married Eleanor Wynne Morris, with whom he had five children: Rowland McDonald Morris 4 Nov 1927 – 5 Nov 1927, Ian Morris 9 Dec 1928, Elwynne Morris 12 Feb 1932, Gwynneth Margaret Morris 18 Apr 1936, Linley McDonald Morris 21 Sep 1943.

He married Tomoko Matsuda on 20 April 1963.

Victorian Legislative Assembly
Preceded by Harold Cohen	Member for Caulfield; 1943–1945	Succeeded by Alexander Dennett
