= Frederick Forrest =

Australian politician

Member of the Victorian Legislative Assembly for Caulfield
- In office 9 April 1927 – 20 October 1930
- Preceded by: New seat
- Succeeded by: Harold Luxton

Personal details
- Born: 9 April 1877 Rheola, Victoria
- Died: 20 October 1930 (aged 53) East Melbourne, Victoria
- Resting place: Brighton Cemetery
- Party: Australian Liberal Party

Military service
- Allegiance: Australia
- Branch/service: Australian Army
- Years of service: 1900–1930
- Rank: Lieutenant Colonel
- Commands: 10th Field Artillery Brigade (1926–30); 110th Howitzer Battery (1917)
- Battles/wars: First World War; Gallipoli Campaign; Western Front; Battle of Passchendaele
- Awards: Military Cross

Frederick Edward Forrest MC (9 April 1877 – 20 October 1930) was an Australian soldier and politician.

He was born in Rheola, Victoria, to miner Edward James Forrest and Cecelia Hannah Atchison. He worked in Queensland and joined the volunteer defence forces in Victoria before moving to Launceston. On 14 September 1904 he married Bertha Ada Graham, with whom he had three children. During the First World War he served with the 7th Battalion and artillery units, and was wounded at Gallipoli and Passchendaele, winning the Military Cross. After the war he was secretary of the Tasmanian Returned and Services League (RSL) from 1919 to 1921, and from 1921 to 1924 he was the RSL's general secretary. In 1924 he returned to Melbourne, becoming an estate agent, although he remained a lieutenant colonel in the Citizen Military Forces. In 1927 he was elected to the Victorian Legislative Assembly for Caulfield, representing the new Australian Liberal Party. Re-elected as a Liberal in 1929, he died in East Melbourne in 1930.

Victorian Legislative Assembly
New seat	Member for Caulfield; 1927–1930	Succeeded by Harold Luxton
