= Ted Tanner =

Australian politician

Edgar Miles Ponsonby "Ted" Tanner (born 19 March 1947) is a former Australian politician.

He was born in Caulfield; his father, Sir Edgar Tanner, was a Victorian MLA from 1955 to 1976. He attended Melbourne Grammar School and received a Master of Business Administration from Swinburne University of Technology. From 1971 to 1973 he was private secretary to the Victorian Minister for Health and from 1973 to 1976 the Chief secretary, before becoming Victorian tourism promotion officer in London from 1976 to 1979.

A member of the Liberal Party from 1958, he was elected to the Victorian Legislative Assembly in 1979 as the member for Caulfield. Appointed Shadow Minister for Labour and Industry in 1982 and adding Tourism in 1983, he went to the backbench in 1985 before assuming the role of Opposition Whip in 1988. He held the position into government, but retired from politics in 1996.

From 1996 to 2000 he was chairman of EcoRecycle Victoria, and since 1999 he has been a member of the Victorian Liquor Licensing Panel.

Victorian Legislative Assembly
Preceded by Charles Francis	Member for Caulfield; 1979–1996	Succeeded by Helen Shardey
