= Harold Luxton =

Australian politician (1888–1957)

Sir Harold Daniel Luxton (25 June 1888 – 24 October 1957) was an Australian politician.

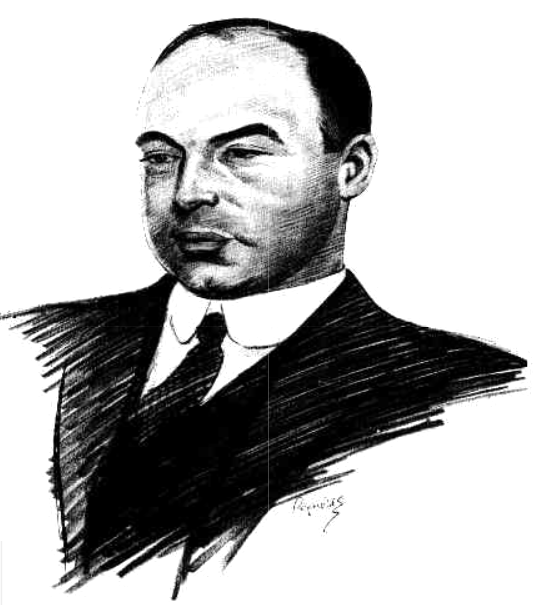
1928 caricature by Reynolds

He was born in Kangaroo Flat to Thomas Luxton and Sarah Schooling. He was a director of J. McEwan and Company from 1910, and on 17 November 1909 married Doris Mary Lewis, with whom he had four children. He attended Melbourne Grammar School, and during World War I served with the 4th Artillery Brigade in Egypt and France and then from 1916 the Royal Air Force; he was shot down and wounded in 1917. He served on Melbourne City Council from 1919 to 1943 and was Lord Mayor from 1928 to 1931.

In 1930 he was elected to the Victorian Legislative Assembly as the Nationalist member for Caulfield. Knighted in 1932, he served in the Assembly until his retirement in 1935.

He was later a member of the International Olympic Committee in 1946, which selected Melbourne for the 1956 Olympic Games. Luxton died in Dandenong in 1957.

Victorian Legislative Assembly
Preceded by Frederick Forrest	Member for Caulfield; 1930–1935	Succeeded by Harold Cohen
Civic offices
Preceded by Sir Stephen Morell	Lord Mayor of Melbourne; 1928–1931	Succeeded by Harold Smith
