= Helen Shardey =

Australian politician

Helen Jean Shardey OAM (born in Melbourne) was an Australian State Politician for the Liberal Party who held the seat of Caulfield from 1996 to 2010. She served as the Shadow Minister for Ageing, Community Services, Muticultural Affairs, Housing, and later Shadow Minister for Health (including Mental Health).

In 1999 as the Member for Caulfield Helen Shardey was awarded a Jerusalem Day Prize. In recognition of her support for the Melbourne Jewish Community and the State of Israel, after just three years in Parliament.

In 2009 Helen announced that she would be retiring from the Victorian parliament at the 2010 State Election. Shardey went on to endorse current MP, David Southwick.

In 2021 Shardey was awarded the Medal Of The Order Of Australia (OAM). This was in recognition for her long and continuous service to the Jewish Community and her work as the Member of Caulfield. Saying “I never felt like a Politician but a Parliamentarian. I represented everyone in my electorate, not just those who voted for me”.

She is the former President of the Jewish National Fund (JNF) in Victoria and is the former Vice President of the Jewish National Fund Australia (2017). Helen has also served on the boards of Temple Beth Israel, Progressive Judaism Victoria and the Union for Progressive Judaism.

After retiring from Parliament Shardey went on to chair the board of Alfred Hospital, until she retired from the board in 2017.

Helen retired as the president of The Australian Reform Zionist Association (ARZA), and Vice President of the Union of Progressive Judaism UPJ, following her 4 year term, in 2023.

Victorian Legislative Assembly
Preceded by Ted Tanner	Member for Caulfield; 1996–2010	Succeeded by David Southwick
