= Division of Macnamara =

Australian federal electoral division

Macnamara Australian House of Representatives Division
- Interactive map of electorate boundaries from the 2025 federal election
- Created: 2019
- MP: Josh Burns
- Party: Labor
- Namesake: Dame Jean Macnamara
- Electors: 114,610 (2025)
- Area: 38 km^{2} (14.7 sq mi)
- Demographic: Inner metropolitan
- Coordinates: 37°51′36″S 144°58′48″E
Electorates around Macnamara:
Fraser	Melbourne	Kooyong
Fraser	Macnamara	Chisholm; Hotham
Fraser	Port Phillip	Goldstein

The Division of Macnamara is an Australian Electoral Division in the state of Victoria, which was contested for the first time at the 2019 federal election. The division is named in honour of Dame Jean Macnamara, a doctor and medical researcher who specialised in the polio virus and was involved in children's health initiatives.

The current member is Josh Burns of the Australian Labor Party, who has represented the division since the 2019 Australian federal election.

== Geography ==
Since 1984, federal electoral division boundaries in Australia have been determined at redistributions by a redistribution committee appointed by the Australian Electoral Commission. Redistributions occur for the boundaries of divisions in a particular state, and they occur every seven years, or sooner if a state's representation entitlement changes or when divisions of a state are malapportioned.

== History ==
The Division of Macnamara was created in 2018 after the Australian Electoral Commission oversaw a mandatory redistribution of divisions in Victoria. Macnamara covers most of what was previously the Division of Melbourne Ports, which it replaced in the redistribution. The division is located in Melbourne's south around the eastern shores of Port Phillip Bay and takes in the suburbs of Port Melbourne, Albert Park, Balaclava, Caulfield, Elwood, Middle Park, Ripponlea, Southbank, South Melbourne and St Kilda, as well as parts of Glen Huntly and Elsternwick. It also includes the suburb of Windsor, which had previously been located in the neighbouring division of Higgins.

The seat was notionally held by the Labor Party on a 1.3% margin over the Liberal Party. Its predecessor, Melbourne Ports, had been held by Labor without interruption since 1906, and for over 80 years had been one of Labor's safest seats. However, Labor's hold on the seat became increasingly tenuous after a 1990 redistribution added some wealthier territory around Caulfield. Further analysis identified that the margin between the Labor Party and the Greens had narrowed to less than 0.3% as a result of recent boundary adjustments.

The last member for Melbourne Ports, Michael Danby, opted not to contest the election for the new Macnamara.

The 2022 election in Macnamara was a close race between Labor's new candidate Josh Burns and the Greens' candidate Steph Hodgins-May. After several days of counting, Josh Burns narrowly won the seat, securing Labor a majority in the House of Representatives.

== Demographics ==
Macnamara is undergoing rapid inner-city gentrification and contains high-density housing developments. It is notable for its high Jewish population; at the time of the 2025 Australian federal election, 10% of Macnamara's population was Jewish, making it the second-largest Jewish electorate in Australia. The incumbent MP, Josh Burns, is himself the grandson of Jewish migrants who left Europe and settled in Melbourne in search of a safe place to raise their families.

== Members ==
Image	Member	Party	Term	Notes
	Josh Burns (1987–)	Labor	18 May 2019 – present	Incumbent

== Election results ==
2025 Australian federal election: Macnamara
Party	Candidate	Votes	%	±%
Labor	Josh Burns	36,228	36.11	+4.45
Liberal	Benson Saulo	32,606	32.50	+3.38
Greens	Sonya Semmens	25,561	25.47	−4.19
One Nation	Sean Rubin	2,803	2.79	+1.40
Independent	JB Myers	1,841	1.83	−0.06
Libertarian	Michael Abelman	1,299	1.29	−0.83
Total formal votes		100,338	97.81	+1.23
Informal votes		2,246	2.19	−1.23
Turnout		102,584	89.53	+3.12
Two-party-preferred result
Labor	Josh Burns	62,004	61.80	−0.37
Liberal	Benson Saulo	38,334	38.20	+0.37
Labor hold		Swing	−0.37	
