= Electoral district of Caulfield =

State electoral district of Victoria, Australia

Caulfield Victoria—Legislative Assembly
- Interactive map of electoral district boundaries from the 2022 state election
- State: Victoria
- Created: 1927
- MP: David Southwick
- Party: Liberal Party
- Namesake: Caulfield
- Electors: 45,222 (2018)
- Area: 17 km^{2} (6.6 sq mi)
- Demographic: Metropolitan
- Coordinates: 37°53′S 145°01′E

The electoral district of Caulfield is an electoral district of the Victorian Legislative Assembly that has existed since 1927.

It covers the metropolitan suburbs of Caulfield, Caulfield North, Caulfield South, Caulfield East, Elsternwick, Gardenvale, Ripponlea and Balaclava and parts of St Kilda East, St Kilda, Glen Huntly and Ormond.

The longest serving member is Ted Tanner, who held the seat for a period of 17 years, between 1979 and 1996.

The seat lies in the inner south-east metropolitan Melbourne and was once safe for the Liberal Party. However, a changing demographic and on-going electoral boundary changes have made the electorate increasingly marginal over the past decade. In the 2018 Victorian state election, the seat was won by the Liberal Party by just 205 votes.

The seat has been held by the Liberal Party for the majority of the time since its creation in 1927. The Labor Party has never held the seat.

Deputy Leader for the Victorian Liberal Party David Southwick is the current member of parliament for Caulfield.

== Members for Caulfield ==
Member	Party	Term
Frederick Forrest	Liberal	1927–1930
Harold Luxton	United Australia	1930–1935
Harold Cohen	United Australia	1935–1943
Andrew Hughes	Independent Socialist	1943–1945
Alexander Dennett	Liberal	1945–1953
Alexander Dennett	Electoral Reform	1953–1955
Joe Rafferty	Liberal	1955–1958
Alexander Fraser	Liberal	1958–1965
Ian McLaren	Liberal	1965–1967
Edgar Tanner	Liberal	1967–1976
Charles Francis	Liberal	1976–1977
Charles Francis	Independent Liberal	1977–1979
Ted Tanner	Liberal	1979–1996
Helen Shardey	Liberal	1996–2010
David Southwick	Liberal	2010–present

== Election results ==
2022 Victorian state election: Caulfield
Party	Candidate	Votes	%	±%
Liberal	David Southwick	18,088	44.5	−1.6
Labor	Lior Harel	11,301	27.8	−6.2
Greens	Rachel Iampolski	6,447	15.8	+1.1
Independent	Nomi Kaltmann	2,643	6.5	+6.5
Animal Justice	Asher Myerson	908	2.2	−0.8
Liberal Democrats	Michael Abelman	739	1.8	+1.8
Family First	Lynne Edwell	557	1.4	+1.4
Total formal votes		40,683	96.7	+1.1
Informal votes		1,374	3.3	−1.1
Turnout		42,057	86.7	−1.4
Two-party-preferred result
Liberal	David Southwick	21,183	52.1	+2.0
Labor	Lior Harel	19,500	47.9	−2.0
Liberal hold		Swing	+2.0	
