= David Southwick =

Australian politician (born 1968)

David Southwick MP
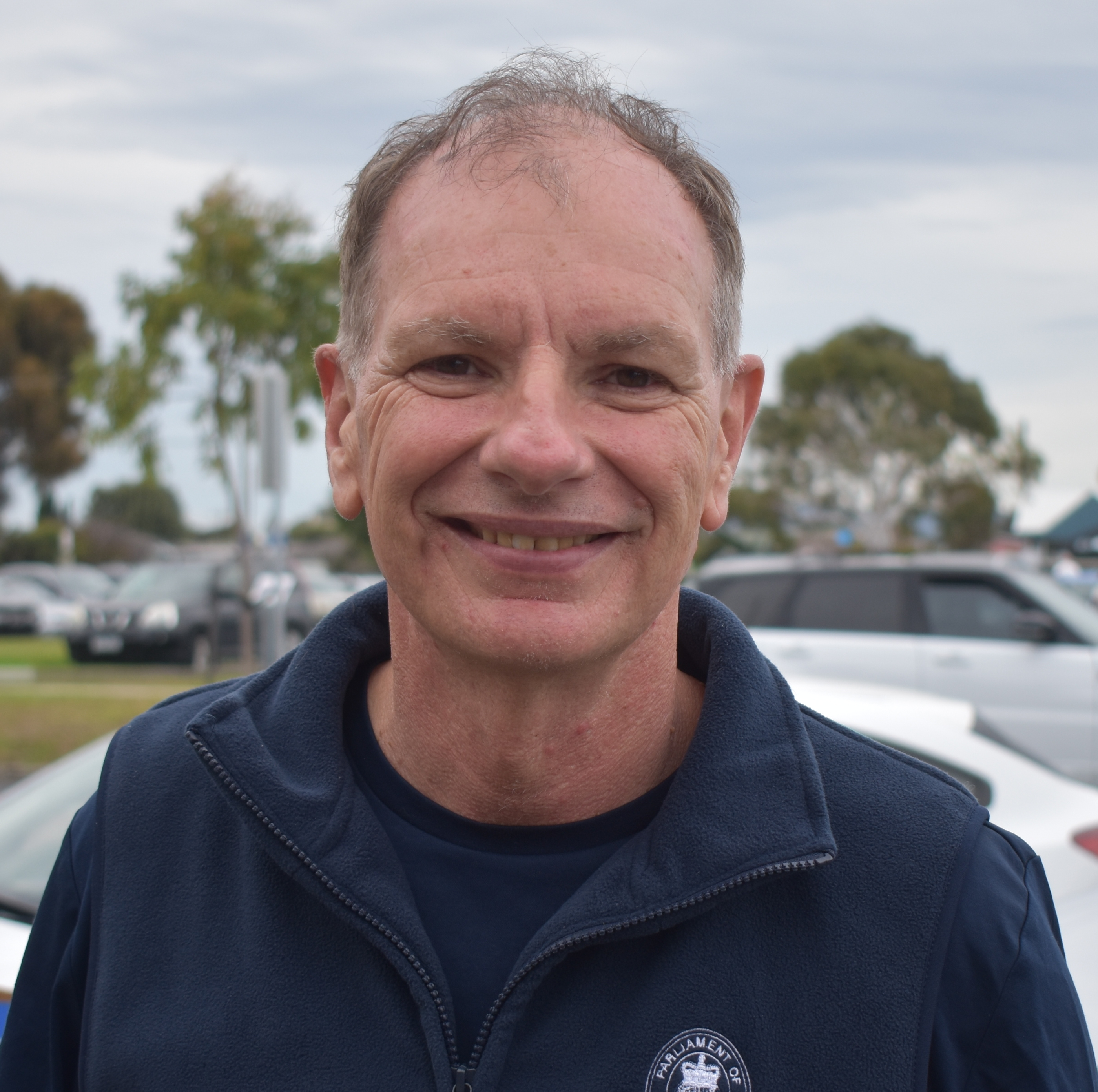
- Southwick in 2026

Deputy Leader of the Liberal Party in Victoria
- Incumbent
- Assumed office 28 January 2026
- Leader: Jess Wilson
- Preceded by: Sam Groth
- In office 7 September 2021 – 27 December 2024
- Leader: Matthew Guy; John Pesutto
- Preceded by: Cindy McLeish
- Succeeded by: Sam Groth

Member of the Victorian Legislative Assembly for Caulfield
- Incumbent
- Assumed office 27 November 2010
- Preceded by: Helen Shardey

Personal details
- Born: 31 March 1968 (age 58) Melbourne, Australia
- Party: Liberal
- Spouse: Hayley Southwick
- Children: 2
- Profession: Politician; managing director; lecturer
- Website: davidsouthwick.com.au

David James Southwick (born 31 March 1968) is an Australian Liberal politician, and has been the member for Caulfield in the Victorian Legislative Assembly since 2010. Southwick has been the Parliamentary Secretary for Police and Emergency Services. He has also held positions of Shadow Minister for Police and Corrections, Crime Prevention, Youth and Youth Justice, Trade and Investment, Shadow Minister for Transport Infrastructure, Shadow Minister for Major Projects, and Shadow Minister for Cost of Living. As of November 2025, Southwick is the Shadow Minister for Planning and the Shadow Minister for Housing and Building. From 7 September 2021 until 27 December 2024, Southwick was the Deputy Leader of the Liberal Party in Victoria. As of July 2026, he is currently serving as deputy leader.

== Early life ==
Southwick was born in Caulfield, one of three children born to Beryl and Stuart Southwick. His father ran a soap business in Laverton and served on the City of Werribee for nearly 30 years.

Southwick completed his high school certificate at Caulfield Grammar and studied a Bachelor of Business at Victoria University, later pursuing a postgraduate study at the Monash University Caulfield campus.

== Business career ==
While at university, Southwick started his business career, including founding and serving as managing director of The Body Collection. In this business, he employed 50 staff.

Southwick also worked as a lecturer at both Victoria University and RMIT. He served as RMIT's first Entrepreneur in Residence in 2003.

He has previously been the Chair of the Ardoch Youth Foundation.

== Political career ==
Southwick was the unsuccessful Liberal candidate for the Division of Melbourne Ports in the 2004 federal election, achieving a swing of almost 2 points against the incumbent MP Michael Danby. In the 2006 state election he was a Liberal candidate for the Southern Metropolitan Region, but did not win the election.

Southwick was elected as the member for Caulfield in 2010.

In November 2012, it was revealed that Southwick had provided misleading information on his website, claiming to have been an 'Adjunct Professor' at RMIT, and having a graduate diploma in marketing from Monash University, despite being several units short. Both universities stated that Southwick had never obtained the qualifications referred to. The information was subsequently removed from his website. Southwick responded to the claims by saying that 'Adjunct Professor' was a title used to refer to him while undertaking teaching overseas on behalf of the RMIT Graduate School of Business in Hong Kong, when he was an adjunct lecturer.

In April 2013, Southwick was appointed Parliamentary Secretary for Police and Emergency Services.

After the defeat of the Napthine government in November 2014, Southwick was appointed Shadow Minister for Energy and Resources, Shadow Minister for Renewables, and Shadow Minister for Innovation.

In December 2018, he was appointed Shadow Minister for Police, Community Safety, and Corrections, with his portfolio expanding to include Shadow Minister for Crime Prevention and Youth Justice in March 2021.

In September 2021, Southwick was elected deputy leader of the state Liberal Party and held this position until the 2024 Victorian Liberal Party leadership spill.

In January 2026, Southwick returned to the deputy leadership of the Liberal Party following a leadership election where his opponent was Chris Crewther.

=== Policy positions ===
In a 2015 conscience vote, Southwick was one of just 13 lower house MPs to vote against the creation of safe access zones outside abortion clinics. He was praised for this decision by the anti-abortion group Right to Life Australia

In a 2018 conscience vote, Southwick voted against the legalisation of voluntary assisted dying.

During the 2018 Victorian state election, Southwick opposed the Safe Schools anti-bullying program, claiming "really young children [are] being exposed to sexual education". In 2019, Southwick voted against a bill that would allow transgender people to change their gender on their birth certificate.

In 2020, Southwick was critical of the Victorian Department of Education for antisemitic and anti-Israeli bullying in a Melbourne school, accusing the Department of "systemic failings".

Southwick criticised the government for its response to the COVID-19 pandemic, claiming that mismanagement of hotel quarantine caused the death of 800 Victorians.

Amidst the 2022 Victorian state election campaign, The Guardian reported that video ads posted by Southwick's campaign to social media featured his employees, including his campaign manager, without disclosure of their connection to Southwick. When asked by a journalist if the videos were misleading, opposition leader Matthew Guy disagreed, stating that Southwick worked hard as a local MP.

On 14 October 2025, Southwick was one of several Liberal MPs who applauded the speeches of Aboriginal activists who spoke in favour of treaty, during parliamentary debate on the Statewide Treaty Bill 2025.

== Personal life ==
Southwick is of Polish-Jewish and Hungarian-Jewish heritage.

As of March 2025, Southwick had an interest in 16 properties, including his primary home, receiving rental income from five of them.

Victorian Legislative Assembly
Preceded by Helen Shardey	Member for Caulfield; 2010–present	Incumbent
