= Results of the 1999 Victorian state election (Legislative Assembly) =

Australian state election results

Victorian state election, 18 September 1999 Legislative Assembly << 1996–2002 >>
Enrolled voters	3,130,338				
Votes cast	2,826,467		Turnout	94.21	+0.13
Informal votes	72,800		Informal	2.58	+0.28
Summary of votes by party
Party	Primary votes	%	Swing	Seats	Change
Labor	1,289,696	45.57	+2.44	42	+13
Liberal	1,194,998	42.22	–1.77	36	–13
National	135,930	4.80	–1.69	7	– 2
Greens	32,570	1.15	+1.15	0	± 0
Hope	10,894	0.39	+0.39	0	± 0
One Nation	8,181	0.29	+0.29	0	± 0
Democrats	7,972	0.28	+0.28	0	± 0
Democratic Labor	6,183	0.22	+0.22	0	± 0
Natural Law	6,044	0.21	–1.65	0	± 0
Shooters	2,011	0.07	+0.03	0	± 0
Reform	1,483	0.05	+0.05	0	± 0
Christian Democrats	414	0.02	–0.21	0	± 0
Independent	133,895	4.73	+1.12	3	+ 2
Total	2,830,271			88	
Two-party-preferred
Labor	1,420,775	50.20	+3.66		
Liberal/National	1,409,567	49.80	–3.66		

This is a list of electoral district results for the 1999 Victorian state election.

== Results by electoral district ==
=== Albert Park ===
1999 Victorian state election: Albert Park
Party	Candidate	Votes	%	±%
Labor	John Thwaites	18,997	56.4	−0.7
Liberal	Rob Rushford	14,671	43.6	+4.1
Total formal votes		33,668	97.1	−0.7
Informal votes		989	2.9	+0.7
Turnout		34,657	88.0	
Labor hold		Swing	−2.4	

=== Altona ===
1999 Victorian state election: Altona
Party	Candidate	Votes	%	±%
Labor	Lynne Kosky	21,545	64.7	+7.9
Liberal	Steve Lambrinakos	11,774	35.3	−4.2
Total formal votes		33,319	96.2	−0.9
Informal votes		1,303	3.8	+0.9
Turnout		34,622	94.6	
Labor hold		Swing	+6.5	

=== Ballarat East ===
1999 Victorian state election: Ballarat East
Party	Candidate	Votes	%	±%
Labor	Geoff Howard	16,100	53.7	+5.8
Liberal	Barry Traynor	13,886	46.3	−2.0
Total formal votes		29,986	97.7	−0.7
Informal votes		706	2.3	+0.7
Turnout		30,692	94.4	
Labor gain from Liberal		Swing	+3.7	

=== Ballarat West ===
1999 Victorian state election: Ballarat West
Party	Candidate	Votes	%	±%
Labor	Karen Overington	15,527	51.0	+5.2
Liberal	Judy Verlin	14,910	49.0	−0.5
Total formal votes		30,437	97.6	−0.6
Informal votes		744	2.4	+0.6
Turnout		31,181	94.8	
Labor gain from Liberal		Swing	+2.4	

=== Bayswater ===
1999 Victorian state election: Bayswater
Party	Candidate	Votes	%	±%
Liberal	Gordon Ashley	17,165	53.2	−2.8
Labor	Susan Craven	13,732	42.5	+1.4
Hope	James Bristow	1,380	4.3	+4.3
Total formal votes		32,277	97.6	−0.5
Informal votes		786	2.4	+0.5
Turnout		33,063	93.3	
Two-party-preferred result
Liberal	Gordon Ashley	17,654	54.7	−2.8
Labor	Susan Craven	14,623	45.3	+2.8
Liberal hold		Swing	−2.8	

=== Bellarine ===
1999 Victorian state election: Bellarine
Party	Candidate	Votes	%	±%
Liberal	Garry Spry	15,875	49.5	−6.1
Labor	Kerri Erler	14,289	44.5	+0.1
Democrats	Erica Menheere-Thompson	1,930	6.0	+6.0
Total formal votes		32,094	98.2	−0.1
Informal votes		599	1.8	+0.1
Turnout		32,693	95.0	−0.8
Two-party-preferred result
Liberal	Garry Spry	16,599	51.7	−3.8
Labor	Kerri Erler	15,495	48.3	+3.8
Liberal hold		Swing	−3.8	

=== Benalla ===
1999 Victorian state election: Benalla
Party	Candidate	Votes	%	±%
National	Pat McNamara	17,543	57.4	−1.5
Labor	Denise Allen	13,013	42.6	+19.0
Total formal votes		30,556	96.4	−1.6
Informal votes		1,128	3.6	+1.6
Turnout		31,684	93.0	−1.9
National hold		Swing	−7.9	

=== Benambra ===
1999 Victorian state election: Benambra
Party	Candidate	Votes	%	±%
Liberal	Tony Plowman	18,016	57.1	−5.8
Labor	Barb Murdoch	13,561	42.9	+9.8
Total formal votes		31,577	97.1	−0.9
Informal votes		931	2.9	+0.9
Turnout		32,508	91.9	−1.4
Liberal hold		Swing	−7.8	

=== Bendigo East ===
1999 Victorian state election: Bendigo East
Party	Candidate	Votes	%	±%
Labor	Jacinta Allan	15,478	48.4	+6.6
Liberal	Michael John	14,123	44.2	−8.1
Greens	Bruce Rivendell	1,552	4.9	+4.9
Reform	Alf Thorpe	828	2.6	+2.6
Total formal votes		31,981	98.3	−0.4
Informal votes		567	1.7	+0.4
Turnout		32,548	95.5	+0.8
Two-party-preferred result
Labor	Jacinta Allan	16,977	53.1	+8.1
Liberal	Michael John	15,004	46.9	−8.1
Labor gain from Liberal		Swing	+8.1	

=== Bendigo West ===
1999 Victorian state election: Bendigo West
Party	Candidate	Votes	%	±%
Labor	Bob Cameron	18,315	56.4	+12.7
Liberal	Felix Cappy	11,679	36.0	−7.0
Greens	Anne Hall	1,391	4.3	+4.3
Independent	Alan Howard	1,092	3.4	+3.4
Total formal votes		32,477	98.1	−0.4
Informal votes		638	1.9	+0.4
Turnout		33,115	94.8	−0.1
Two-party-preferred result
Labor	Bob Cameron	19,893	61.3	+9.6
Liberal	Felix Cappy	12,582	38.7	−9.6
Labor hold		Swing	+9.6	

=== Bennettswood ===
1999 Victorian state election: Bennettswood
Party	Candidate	Votes	%	±%
Liberal	Ron Wilson	16,715	56.1	−2.0
Labor	Meryl Andrews	13,103	43.9	+4.4
Total formal votes		29,818	97.6	−0.5
Informal votes		733	2.4	+0.5
Turnout		30,551	93.1	
Liberal hold		Swing	−3.1	

=== Bentleigh ===
1999 Victorian state election: Bentleigh
Party	Candidate	Votes	%	±%
Liberal	Inga Peulich	15,679	49.9	−3.9
Labor	Cartha Maloney	13,831	44.0	+0.1
Greens	Nick Brunton	1,139	3.6	+3.6
Democratic Labor	Gail King	492	1.6	+1.6
Independent	Marcus Barber	296	0.9	+0.9
Total formal votes		31,437	97.3	−0.7
Informal votes		865	2.7	+0.7
Turnout		32,302	93.7	−1.4
Two-party-preferred result
Liberal	Inga Peulich	16,300	51.9	−2.8
Labor	Cartha Maloney	15,090	48.1	+2.8
Liberal hold		Swing	−2.8	

=== Berwick ===
1999 Victorian state election: Berwick
Party	Candidate	Votes	%	±%
Liberal	Robert Dean	21,958	53.9	+0.8
Labor	Philip Reed	17,248	42.4	−0.3
Democratic Labor	Michael Rowe	1,519	3.7	+3.7
Total formal votes		40,725	97.0	−0.4
Informal votes		1,241	3.0	+0.4
Turnout		41,966	94.4	
Two-party-preferred result
Liberal	Robert Dean	22,376	54.9	−0.4
Labor	Philip Reed	18,348	45.1	+0.4
Liberal hold		Swing	−0.4	

=== Box Hill ===
1999 Victorian state election: Box Hill
Party	Candidate	Votes	%	±%
Liberal	Robert Clark	17,299	56.1	−3.0
Labor	Claire Thorn	12,166	39.5	+1.2
Hope	June Walters	1,356	4.4	+4.4
Total formal votes		30,821	97.9	−0.4
Informal votes		671	2.1	+0.4
Turnout		31,492	92.4	
Two-party-preferred result
Liberal	Robert Clark	17,754	57.6	−2.7
Labor	Claire Thorn	13,067	42.4	+2.7
Liberal hold		Swing	−2.7	

=== Brighton ===
1999 Victorian state election: Brighton
Party	Candidate	Votes	%	±%
Liberal	Louise Asher	17,701	57.9	−8.8
Labor	Irene Dunsmuir	6,973	22.8	−7.3
Independent	Alex Del Porto	5,920	19.4	+19.4
Total formal votes		30,594	97.9	−0.4
Informal votes		664	2.1	+0.4
Turnout		31,258	91.3	
Two-party-preferred result
Liberal	Louise Asher	20,061	65.6	−2.5
Labor	Irene Dunsmuir	10,529	34.4	+2.5
Liberal hold		Swing	−2.5	

=== Broadmeadows ===
1999 Victorian state election: Broadmeadows
Party	Candidate	Votes	%	±%
Labor	John Brumby	22,768	71.7	+0.0
Liberal	Paul Tay	6,889	21.7	−1.7
Independent	Graeme Marr	1,022	3.2	+3.2
Independent	Abboud Haidar	789	2.5	+2.5
Independent	Joseph Kaliniy	269	0.8	+0.8
Total formal votes		31,687	94.3	−2.7
Informal votes		1,898	5.7	+2.7
Turnout		33,585	91.9	
Two-party-preferred result
Labor	John Brumby	23,651	74.7	−0.4
Liberal	Paul Tay	8,019	25.3	+0.4
Labor hold		Swing	−0.4	

=== Bulleen ===
1999 Victorian state election: Bulleen
Party	Candidate	Votes	%	±%
Liberal	Nicholas Kotsiras	17,843	58.7	−4.7
Labor	Chris Miras	9,810	32.3	−1.1
Greens	Robert Trafficante	1,832	6.0	+6.0
Hope	Damian Manassa	890	2.9	+2.9
Total formal votes		30,375	96.9	−0.5
Informal votes		982	3.1	+0.5
Turnout		31,357	92.9	
Two-party-preferred result
Liberal	Nicholas Kotsiras	18,709	61.6	−3.0
Labor	Chris Miras	11,662	38.4	+3.0
Liberal hold		Swing	−3.0	

=== Bundoora ===
1999 Victorian state election: Bundoora
Party	Candidate	Votes	%	±%
Labor	Sherryl Garbutt	18,375	54.4	+3.9
Liberal	Carol McCabe	14,612	43.2	−3.3
Natural Law	Ngaire Mason	807	2.4	−0.6
Total formal votes		33,794	97.2	−0.8
Informal votes		973	2.8	+0.8
Turnout		34,767	94.6	
Two-party-preferred result
Labor	Sherryl Garbutt	18,942	56.1	+3.5
Liberal	Carol McCabe	14,852	43.9	−3.5
Labor hold		Swing	+3.5	

=== Burwood ===
1999 Victorian state election: Burwood
Party	Candidate	Votes	%	±%
Liberal	Jeff Kennett	17,455	55.5	−1.7
Labor	Bob Stensholt	13,062	41.5	+2.0
Natural Law	Mark Bunn	734	2.3	−0.9
Abolish Child Support	Justice Abolish	194	0.6	+0.6
Total formal votes		31,445	97.6	−0.7
Informal votes		789	2.4	+0.7
Turnout		32,234	93.0	
Two-party-preferred result
Liberal	Jeff Kennett	17,858	56.8	−1.8
Labor	Bob Stensholt	13,585	43.2	+1.8
Liberal hold		Swing	−1.8	

=== Carrum ===
1999 Victorian state election: Carrum
Party	Candidate	Votes	%	±%
Liberal	David Lean	16,770	48.2	−1.1
Labor	Jenny Lindell	16,099	46.3	+0.4
Greens	Dan Bray	1,896	5.5	+5.5
Total formal votes		34,765	97.5	−0.5
Informal votes		899	2.5	+0.5
Turnout		35,664	93.5	
Two-party-preferred result
Labor	Jenny Lindell	17,444	50.2	+1.0
Liberal	David Lean	17,321	49.8	−1.0
Labor gain from Liberal		Swing	+1.0	

=== Caulfield ===
1999 Victorian state election: Caulfield
Party	Candidate	Votes	%	±%
Liberal	Helen Shardey	18,947	58.5	−0.8
Labor	Harry Simon	13,460	41.5	+0.8
Total formal votes		32,407	96.9	−0.7
Informal votes		1,024	3.1	+0.7
Turnout		33,431	88.9	
Liberal hold		Swing	−0.8	

=== Clayton ===
1999 Victorian state election: Clayton
Party	Candidate	Votes	%	±%
Labor	Hong Lim	20,037	61.7	+2.1
Liberal	Collin Lok	12,441	38.3	−2.1
Total formal votes		32,478	95.6	−1.3
Informal votes		1,503	4.4	+1.3
Turnout		33,981	92.7	
Labor hold		Swing	+2.1	

=== Coburg ===
1999 Victorian state election: Coburg
Party	Candidate	Votes	%	±%
Labor	Carlo Carli	18,877	64.7	−0.3
Liberal	Mark Hrycek	7,765	26.6	−3.9
Greens	Emma Rush	2,547	8.7	+8.7
Total formal votes		29,189	95.9	−1.0
Informal votes		1,248	4.1	+1.0
Turnout		30,437	86.1	−6.0
Two-party-preferred result
Labor	Carlo Carli	20,951	71.8	+4.9
Liberal	Mark Hrycek	8,232	28.2	−4.9
Labor hold		Swing	+4.9	

=== Cranbourne ===
1999 Victorian state election: Cranbourne
Party	Candidate	Votes	%	±%
Liberal	Gary Rowe	20,444	54.2	−4.8
Labor	Jude Perera	14,892	39.5	−1.5
Independent	Carol McCormack	2,379	6.3	+6.3
Total formal votes		37,715	97.4	+0.1
Informal votes		997	2.6	−0.1
Turnout		38,712	94.2	
Two-party-preferred result
Liberal	Gary Rowe	21,002	55.7	−3.4
Labor	Jude Perera	16,708	44.3	+3.4
Liberal hold		Swing	−3.4	

=== Dandenong ===
1999 Victorian state election: Dandenong
Party	Candidate	Votes	%	±%
Labor	John Pandazopoulos	23,129	55.8	+2.5
Liberal	Astrid Miller	18,297	44.2	−2.5
Total formal votes		41,426	96.0	−0.4
Informal votes		1,733	4.0	+0.4
Turnout		43,159	93.7	
Labor hold		Swing	+2.5	

=== Dandenong North ===
1999 Victorian state election: Dandenong North
Party	Candidate	Votes	%	±%
Labor	John Lenders	16,406	53.9	+3.3
Liberal	George Emmanouil	11,908	39.2	−6.8
Independent	Greg Harris	1,820	6.0	+6.0
Reform	Fred Klimek	276	0.9	+0.9
Total formal votes		30,410	95.9	−1.1
Informal votes		1,302	4.1	+1.1
Turnout		31,712	93.8	−0.5
Two-party-preferred result
Labor	John Lenders	17,634	58.0	+5.8
Liberal	George Emmanouil	12,775	42.0	−5.8
Labor hold		Swing	+5.8	

=== Doncaster ===
1999 Victorian state election: Doncaster
Party	Candidate	Votes	%	±%
Liberal	Victor Perton	19,707	60.8	−3.1
Labor	Jessie McCallum	10,579	32.6	−0.3
Greens	Sam Fyfield	1,497	4.6	+4.6
Hope	Geoff Dawe	629	1.9	+1.9
Total formal votes		32,412	97.3	−0.3
Informal votes		915	2.7	+0.3
Turnout		33,327	92.8	
Two-party-preferred result
Liberal	Victor Perton	20,518	63.3	−1.7
Labor	Jessie McCallum	11,892	36.7	+1.7
Liberal hold		Swing	−1.7	

=== Dromana ===
1999 Victorian state election: Dromana
Party	Candidate	Votes	%	±%
Liberal	Martin Dixon	17,900	54.4	+3.5
Labor	Diane Thompson	13,542	41.2	+7.0
Democratic Labor	Pat Crea	951	2.9	+2.9
Natural Law	Jan Charlwood	490	1.5	+0.6
Total formal votes		32,883	97.6	−0.8
Informal votes		799	2.4	+0.8
Turnout		33,682	93.5	−0.7
Two-party-preferred result
Liberal	Martin Dixon	18,480	56.2	−1.9
Labor	Diane Thompson	14,403	43.8	+1.9
Liberal hold		Swing	−1.9	

=== Eltham ===
1999 Victorian state election: Eltham
Party	Candidate	Votes	%	±%
Liberal	Wayne Phillips	18,696	50.3	−4.4
Labor	Pam Hanney	14,325	38.5	+0.2
Independent	Margaret Jennings	1,310	3.5	+3.5
Greens	Jeremy Whitehead	1,237	3.3	+3.3
Democrats	Sean Carter	966	2.6	+2.6
Independent	June English	546	1.5	+1.5
Natural Law	Wendy Rosenfeldt	98	0.3	−0.8
Total formal votes		37,178	97.6	−0.9
Informal votes		907	2.4	+0.9
Turnout		38,085	94.4	
Two-party-preferred result
Liberal	Wayne Phillips	19,960	53.5	−3.3
Labor	Pam Hanney	17,315	46.5	+3.3
Liberal hold		Swing	−3.3	

=== Essendon ===
1999 Victorian state election: Essendon
Party	Candidate	Votes	%	±%
Labor	Judy Maddigan	18,489	58.5	+5.1
Liberal	Ken Saunders	13,135	41.5	−5.1
Total formal votes		31,624	97.4	−0.3
Informal votes		839	2.6	+0.3
Turnout		32,463	93.7	
Labor hold		Swing	+5.1	

=== Evelyn ===
1999 Victorian state election: Evelyn
Party	Candidate	Votes	%	±%
Liberal	Christine Fyffe	18,367	54.8	−5.1
Labor	Natasha Marquez-Bridger	11,480	34.2	+0.8
Independent	Rick Houlihan	1,862	5.6	+5.6
Independent	Colin Gillam	1,824	5.4	+5.4
Total formal votes		33,533	97.0	−0.6
Informal votes		1,042	3.0	+0.6
Turnout		34,575	94.1	
Two-party-preferred result
Liberal	Christine Fyffe	19,957	59.5	−3.2
Labor	Natasha Marquez-Bridger	13,571	40.5	+3.2
Liberal hold		Swing	−3.2	

=== Footscray ===
1999 Victorian state election: Footscray
Party	Candidate	Votes	%	±%
Labor	Bruce Mildenhall	19,916	67.6	−0.4
Liberal	Dina Lynch	9,533	32.4	+2.6
Total formal votes		29,449	95.1	−0.7
Informal votes		1,503	4.9	+0.7
Turnout		30,952	90.6	
Labor hold		Swing	−1.8	

=== Forest Hill ===
1999 Victorian state election: Forest Hill
Party	Candidate	Votes	%	±%
Liberal	John Richardson	17,583	55.9	−3.8
Labor	Julie Buxton	12,895	41.0	+3.3
Hope	Sandra Hardiman	1,000	3.2	+3.2
Total formal votes		31,478	97.5	−0.6
Informal votes		816	2.5	+0.6
Turnout		32,294	93.5	
Two-party-preferred result
Liberal	John Richardson	17,974	57.1	−3.4
Labor	Julie Buxton	13,503	42.9	+3.4
Liberal hold		Swing	−3.4	

=== Frankston ===
1999 Victorian state election: Frankston
Party	Candidate	Votes	%	±%
Liberal	Andrea McCall	17,778	58.6	−5.7
Labor	Darren Koch	10,083	33.2	−0.4
Greens	Henry Kelsall	1,850	6.1	+6.1
Independent	Frank Borg	626	2.1	+2.1
Total formal votes		30,337	97.9	−0.3
Informal votes		635	2.1	+0.3
Turnout		30,972	92.6	
Two-party-preferred result
Liberal	Andrea McCall	18,399	60.7	−4.7
Labor	Darren Koch	11,891	39.3	+4.7
Liberal hold		Swing	−4.7	

=== Frankston East ===
1999 Victorian state election: Frankston East (supplementary)
Party	Candidate	Votes	%	±%
Labor	Matt Viney	13,127	51.4	+7.0
Liberal	Cherie McLean	10,632	41.6	−7.3
Greens	Mervyn Vogt	486	1.9	+1.9
Independent	Graham Eames	319	1.2	+1.2
Independent	Jason Coppard	263	1.0	+1.0
Independent	Garry Burleigh	140	0.5	+0.5
Independent	Scott Rankin	131	0.5	+0.5
Independent	Robert Anderson	95	0.4	+0.4
Democratic Labor	Pat Crea	93	0.4	+0.4
Independent	Malcolm McClure	77	0.3	+0.3
Independent	Ian Bunyan	72	0.3	+0.3
Independent	David Dawn	58	0.2	+0.2
Natural Law	Lawrence Clarke	24	0.1	−1.0
Independent	Geoff Clark	21	0.1	+0.1
Independent	Ivan Pavlekov-Smith	13	0.1	+0.1
Independent	Raymond Hoser	11	0.1	+0.1
Total formal votes		25,562	95.2	−2.6
Informal votes		1,280	4.8	+2.6
Turnout		26,842	93.0	−1.3
Two-party-preferred result
Labor	Matt Viney	13,953	54.6	+7.7
Liberal	Cherie McLean	11,603	45.4	−7.7
Labor gain from Liberal		Swing	+7.7	

=== Geelong ===
1999 Victorian state election: Geelong
Party	Candidate	Votes	%	±%
Liberal	Ann Henderson	14,719	47.5	−5.1
Labor	Ian Trezise	14,001	45.2	+0.1
Independent	Rosemary Faris	1,292	4.2	+4.2
Independent	Luke Grose	641	2.1	+2.1
Independent	John O'Dea	331	1.1	+1.1
Total formal votes		30,984	97.5	−0.3
Informal votes		802	2.5	+0.3
Turnout		31,786	94.0	−0.3
Two-party-preferred result
Labor	Ian Trezise	15,500	50.03	+3.5
Liberal	Ann Henderson	15,484	49.97	−3.5
Labor gain from Liberal		Swing	+3.5	

=== Geelong North ===
1999 Victorian state election: Geelong North
Party	Candidate	Votes	%	±%
Labor	Peter Loney	19,000	60.9	+2.9
Liberal	Bryan Kennett	12,176	39.1	−2.9
Total formal votes		31,176	96.4	−0.6
Informal votes		1,158	3.6	+0.6
Turnout		32,334	94.1	−1.3
Labor hold		Swing	+2.9	

=== Gippsland East ===
1999 Victorian state election: Gippsland East
Party	Candidate	Votes	%	±%
National	David Treasure	10,776	35.9	−16.9
Labor	Bill Bolitho	8,177	27.3	−1.3
Independent	Craig Ingram	7,439	24.8	+24.8
One Nation	Michael Freshwater	1,911	6.4	+6.4
Independent	Ben Buckley	1,704	5.7	+5.7
Total formal votes		30,007	97.4	−0.9
Informal votes		812	2.6	+0.9
Turnout		30,819	93.2	
Two-party-preferred result
National	David Treasure	15,782	52.6	−12.6
Labor	Bill Bolitho	14,222	47.4	+12.6
Two-candidate-preferred result
Independent	Craig Ingram	17,317	57.7	+57.7
National	David Treasure	12,690	42.3	−22.9
Independent gain from National		Swing	+57.7	

=== Gippsland South ===
1999 Victorian state election: Gippsland South
Party	Candidate	Votes	%	±%
National	Peter Ryan	15,130	50.5	−17.2
Labor	Howard Emanuel	9,955	33.2	+4.7
Independent	Mal Sayers	4,411	14.7	+14.7
Natural Law	Rohin Clarke	456	1.5	−2.2
Total formal votes		29,952	97.4	−0.9
Informal votes		800	2.6	+0.9
Turnout		30,752	93.9	
Two-party-preferred result
National	Peter Ryan	17,238	57.5	−11.9
Labor	Howard Emanuel	12,740	42.5	+11.9
National hold		Swing	−11.9	

=== Gippsland West ===
1999 Victorian state election: Gippsland West
Party	Candidate	Votes	%	±%
Liberal	Gerard McRae	11,502	38.0	−19.8
Independent	Susan Davies	10,819	35.7	+35.7
Labor	Pauline Taylor	5,487	18.1	−15.1
National	Wesley Head	1,973	6.5	+6.5
Independent	Mike Lowry	385	1.3	−7.7
Natural Law	Martin Richardson	128	0.4	+0.4
Total formal votes		30,294	97.4	−0.9
Informal votes		821	2.6	+0.9
Turnout		31,115	94.9	
Two-party-preferred result
Liberal	Gerard McRae	17,095	56.4	−6.2
Labor	Pauline Taylor	13,199	43.6	+6.2
Two-candidate-preferred result
Independent	Susan Davies	16,360	54.0	+54.0
Liberal	Gerard McRae	13,934	46.0	−16.6
Independent gain from Liberal		Swing	+54.0	

=== Gisborne ===
1999 Victorian state election: Gisborne
Party	Candidate	Votes	%	±%
Liberal	Rob Knowles	14,084	41.9	−13.8
Labor	Jo Duncan	13,589	40.4	−0.4
Independent	Deb Dunn	3,394	10.1	+10.1
Democrats	Russell Mowatt	1,260	3.7	+3.7
Greens	Lawrie Hall	678	2.0	+2.0
Independent	George Reynolds	643	1.9	+1.9
Total formal votes		33,648	97.2	−0.9
Informal votes		981	2.8	+0.9
Turnout		34,629	95.2	
Two-party-preferred result
Labor	Jo Duncan	17,371	51.6	+9.4
Liberal	Rob Knowles	16,277	48.4	−9.4
Labor gain from Liberal		Swing	+9.4	

=== Glen Waverley ===
1999 Victorian state election: Glen Waverley
Party	Candidate	Votes	%	±%
Liberal	Ross Smith	18,410	63.2	−1.6
Labor	Robert Dalby	10,738	36.8	+4.0
Total formal votes		29,148	97.6	−0.6
Informal votes		714	2.4	+0.6
Turnout		29,862	93.4	−1.4
Liberal hold		Swing	−2.5	

=== Hawthorn ===
1999 Victorian state election: Hawthorn
Party	Candidate	Votes	%	±%
Liberal	Ted Baillieu	20,548	62.6	+1.7
Labor	N. R. Wickiramasingham	10,635	32.4	+3.3
Hope	Kerry Dawborn	1,650	5.0	+5.0
Total formal votes		32,833	97.6	−1.1
Informal votes		792	2.4	+1.1
Turnout		33,625	91.0	
Two-party-preferred result
Liberal	Ted Baillieu	21,042	64.1	+0.5
Labor	N. R. Wickiramasingham	11,791	35.9	−0.5
Liberal hold		Swing	+0.5	

=== Ivanhoe ===
1999 Victorian state election: Ivanhoe
Party	Candidate	Votes	%	±%
Labor	Craig Langdon	15,079	50.1	+0.8
Liberal	Don McLean	12,788	42.5	−5.0
Greens	Robyn Roberts	1,737	5.8	+5.8
Hope	Lee-Anne Poynton	358	1.2	+1.2
Natural Law	Lawrence Clarke	132	0.4	−2.8
Total formal votes		30,094	97.2	−0.7
Informal votes		858	2.8	+0.7
Turnout		30,952	93.2	
Two-party-preferred result
Labor	Craig Langdon	16,679	55.4	+3.8
Liberal	Don McLean	13,413	44.6	−3.8
Labor hold		Swing	+3.8	

=== Keilor ===
1999 Victorian state election: Keilor
Party	Candidate	Votes	%	±%
Labor	George Seitz	22,338	58.7	−0.3
Liberal	Joe Fenech	12,851	33.8	−3.5
Independent	Heather Burns	2,875	7.6	+7.6
Total formal votes		38,064	95.1	−0.7
Informal votes		1,967	4.9	+0.7
Turnout		40,031	95.1	
Two-party-preferred result
Labor	George Seitz	23,529	61.9	+0.3
Liberal	Joe Fenech	14,481	38.1	−0.3
Labor hold		Swing	+0.3	

=== Kew ===
1999 Victorian state election: Kew
Party	Candidate	Votes	%	±%
Liberal	Andrew McIntosh	19,594	61.8	−1.9
Labor	Jonathan Lewes	10,751	33.9	+1.1
Hope	Peter Hale	1,380	4.3	+4.3
Total formal votes		31,725	97.6	−0.6
Informal votes		795	2.4	+0.6
Turnout		32,520	91.2	
Two-party-preferred result
Liberal	Andrew McIntosh	20,247	63.8	−1.2
Labor	Jonathan Lewes	11,478	36.2	+1.2
Liberal hold		Swing	−1.2	

=== Knox ===
1999 Victorian state election: Knox
Party	Candidate	Votes	%	±%
Liberal	Hurtle Lupton	20,481	56.0	−0.9
Labor	Christopher Smith	14,684	40.1	−0.1
Democratic Labor	Ken Wells	1,408	3.8	+3.8
Total formal votes		36,573	97.5	−0.5
Informal votes		943	2.5	+0.5
Turnout		37,516	94.3	−0.6
Two-party-preferred result
Liberal	Hurtle Lupton	20,962	57.3	−0.6
Labor	Christopher Smith	15,611	42.7	+0.6
Liberal hold		Swing	−0.6	

=== Malvern ===
1999 Victorian state election: Malvern
Party	Candidate	Votes	%	±%
Liberal	Robert Doyle	21,129	66.6	+0.2
Labor	Jude Wallace	10,583	33.4	+2.8
Total formal votes		31,712	97.8	−0.3
Informal votes		697	2.2	+0.3
Turnout		32,409	90.2	
Liberal hold		Swing	−1.0	

=== Melbourne ===
1999 Victorian state election: Melbourne
Party	Candidate	Votes	%	±%
Labor	Bronwyn Pike	20,572	59.3	+5.7
Liberal	Lana McLean	12,122	35.0	+4.2
Independent	Jorge Jorquera	1,986	5.7	+5.7
Total formal votes		34,680	96.3	−0.7
Informal votes		1,334	3.7	+0.7
Turnout		36,014	87.8	
Two-party-preferred result
Labor	Bronwyn Pike	22,122	63.8	−2.1
Liberal	Lana McLean	12,568	36.2	+2.1
Labor hold		Swing	−2.1	

=== Melton ===
1999 Victorian state election: Melton
Party	Candidate	Votes	%	±%
Labor	Don Nardella	24,237	61.3	−0.8
Liberal	John McGeary	15,294	38.7	+0.8
Total formal votes		39,531	95.5	−1.2
Informal votes		1,862	4.5	+1.2
Turnout		41,393	94.0	
Labor hold		Swing	+0.8	

=== Mildura ===
1999 Victorian state election: Mildura
Party	Candidate	Votes	%	±%
Independent	Russell Savage	13,551	44.4	+8.7
Liberal	Peter Danson	7,998	26.2	−19.0
National	Anne Mansell	6,015	19.7	+19.7
Labor	John Zigouras	2,572	8.4	−9.5
Democrats	Tom Joyce	391	1.3	+1.3
Total formal votes		30,527	97.6	−0.7
Informal votes		763	2.4	+0.7
Turnout		31,290	94.3	
Two-party-preferred result
Liberal	Peter Danson	19,304	63.2	−1.4
Labor	John Zigouras	11,223	36.8	+1.4
Two-candidate-preferred result
Independent	Russell Savage	17,290	56.6	+5.2
Liberal	Peter Danson	13,237	43.4	−5.2
Independent hold		Swing	+5.2	

=== Mill Park ===
1999 Victorian state election: Mill Park
Party	Candidate	Votes	%	±%
Labor	Alex Andrianopoulos	24,307	64.6	+4.5
Liberal	Andrew Davenport	12,405	33.0	+1.0
Natural Law	Rosie D'Angelo	924	2.5	+0.9
Total formal votes		37,636	96.1	−0.4
Informal votes		1,541	3.9	+0.4
Turnout		39,177	94.5	
Two-party-preferred result
Labor	Alex Andrianopoulos	24,772	65.8	+1.9
Liberal	Andrew Davenport	12,864	34.2	−1.9
Labor hold		Swing	+1.9	

=== Mitcham ===
1999 Victorian state election: Mitcham
Party	Candidate	Votes	%	±%
Liberal	Andrew Munroe	15,043	47.2	−6.4
Labor	Tony Robinson	14,411	45.2	+4.7
Independent	Chris Aubrey	1,529	4.8	+4.8
Hope	Tim Petherbridge	894	2.8	+2.8
Total formal votes		31,877	97.8	−0.3
Informal votes		729	2.2	+0.3
Turnout		32,606	94.6	
Two-party-preferred result
Labor	Tony Robinson	16,110	50.5	+5.8
Liberal	Andrew Munroe	15,767	49.5	−5.8
Labor gain from Liberal		Swing	+5.8	

=== Monbulk ===
1999 Victorian state election: Monbulk
Party	Candidate	Votes	%	±%
Liberal	Steve McArthur	15,206	49.8	−2.7
Labor	Leslie Wood	12,266	40.2	+2.0
Greens	Robyn Holtham	1,928	6.3	+6.3
Democratic Labor	Frank Feltham	443	1.5	+1.5
Christian Democrats	Wolf Voigt	414	1.4	+1.4
Natural Law	Lorna Scurfield	258	0.8	−0.5
Total formal votes		30,515	97.2	−0.8
Informal votes		870	2.8	+0.8
Turnout		31,385	93.3	
Two-party-preferred result
Liberal	Steve McArthur	16,241	53.2	−2.0
Labor	Leslie Wood	14,306	46.8	+2.0
Liberal hold		Swing	−2.0	

=== Mooroolbark ===
1999 Victorian state election: Mooroolbark
Party	Candidate	Votes	%	±%
Liberal	Lorraine Elliott	19,509	60.9	0.0
Labor	Darren McCrorey	12,549	39.1	+2.7
Total formal votes		32,058	97.3	−0.6
Informal votes		896	2.7	+0.6
Turnout		32,954	94.6	−0.3
Liberal hold		Swing	−1.3	

=== Mordialloc ===
1999 Victorian state election: Mordialloc
Party	Candidate	Votes	%	±%
Liberal	Geoff Leigh	15,515	52.2	−1.2
Labor	Robyn McLeod	14,200	47.8	+5.8
Total formal votes		29,715	96.9	−1.2
Informal votes		955	3.1	+1.2
Turnout		30,670	93.4	
Liberal hold		Swing	−2.5	

=== Mornington ===
1999 Victorian state election: Mornington
Party	Candidate	Votes	%	±%
Liberal	Robin Cooper	17,821	53.0	−6.2
Labor	Gwen Cornelius	12,198	36.3	−0.8
Independent	Vivienne Nicholson	2,816	8.4	+8.4
Independent	Snez Plunkett	783	2.3	+2.3
Total formal votes		33,618	97.6	−0.4
Informal votes		813	2.4	+0.4
Turnout		34,431	93.5	
Two-party-preferred result
Liberal	Robin Cooper	18,733	55.7	−5.6
Labor	Gwen Cornelius	14,880	44.3	+5.6
Liberal hold		Swing	−5.6	

=== Morwell ===
1999 Victorian state election: Morwell
Party	Candidate	Votes	%	±%
Labor	Keith Hamilton	17,366	55.5	+4.0
Liberal	Peter Tyler	11,040	35.3	+35.3
Independent	Helen Hoppner	2,912	9.3	+9.3
Total formal votes		31,318	97.8	−0.1
Informal votes		700	2.2	+0.1
Turnout		32,018	94.9	
Two-party-preferred result
Labor	Keith Hamilton	18,457	58.9	+6.2
Liberal	Peter Tyler	12,856	41.1	+41.1
Labor hold		Swing	+6.2	

=== Murray Valley ===
1999 Victorian state election: Murray Valley
Party	Candidate	Votes	%	±%
National	Ken Jasper	20,899	65.9	−5.3
Labor	Zuvele Leschen	10,811	34.1	+8.4
Total formal votes		31,710	97.0	−1.4
Informal votes		990	3.0	+1.4
Turnout		32,700	94.0	
National hold		Swing	−6.5	

=== Narracan ===
1999 Victorian state election: Narracan
Party	Candidate	Votes	%	±%
Labor	Ian Maxfield	13,074	45.6	+3.7
Liberal	Florian Andrighetto	11,925	41.6	−5.8
Democrats	Michael Fozard	1,534	5.3	+5.3
Shooters	Colin Dowling	1,292	4.5	+4.5
Independent	Ray Mathieson	504	1.8	+1.8
Independent	Heather Robinson	355	1.2	+1.2
Total formal votes		28,684	96.8	−1.3
Informal votes		939	3.2	+1.3
Turnout		29,623	93.5	
Two-party-preferred result
Labor	Ian Maxfield	15,063	52.5	+4.1
Liberal	Florian Andrighetto	13,621	47.5	−4.1
Labor gain from Liberal		Swing	+4.1	

=== Niddrie ===
1999 Victorian state election: Niddrie
Party	Candidate	Votes	%	±%
Labor	Rob Hulls	17,761	56.8	+2.4
Liberal	Susannah Kruger	13,525	43.2	−2.4
Total formal votes		31,286	96.2	−0.7
Informal votes		1,252	3.8	+0.7
Turnout		32,538	96.3	
Labor hold		Swing	+2.4	

=== Northcote ===
1999 Victorian state election: Northcote
Party	Candidate	Votes	%	±%
Labor	Mary Delahunty	20,681	66.1	+6.5
Liberal	Elizabeth Richardson	8,124	26.0	−2.2
Independent	Susanna Duffy	2,480	7.9	+7.9
Total formal votes		31,285	96.0	−0.2
Informal votes		1,306	4.0	+0.2
Turnout		32,591	91.3	
Two-party-preferred result
Labor	Mary Delahunty	22,733	72.7	+2.8
Liberal	Elizabeth Richardson	8,552	27.3	−2.8
Labor hold		Swing	+2.8	

=== Oakleigh ===
1999 Victorian state election: Oakleigh
Party	Candidate	Votes	%	±%
Labor	Ann Barker	15,060	49.2	+3.4
Liberal	Denise McGill	13,558	44.3	−3.1
Greens	Susan Walters	1,107	3.6	+3.6
Independent	Stephanie McGregor	452	1.5	+1.5
Independent	Loredana Eboli	268	0.9	+0.9
Natural Law	Raymond Schlager	148	0.5	−0.6
Total formal votes		30,593	96.5	−1.1
Informal votes		1,118	3.5	+1.1
Turnout		31,711	92.3	
Two-party-preferred result
Labor	Ann Barker	16,286	53.3	+4.1
Liberal	Denise McGill	14,262	46.7	−4.1
Labor gain from Liberal		Swing	+4.1	

=== Pakenham ===
1999 Victorian state election: Pakenham
Party	Candidate	Votes	%	±%
Liberal	Rob Maclellan	17,202	53.2	−5.0
Labor	John Anderson	11,949	36.9	+0.8
Greens	Daniel Scoullar	2,571	7.9	+7.9
Independent	Frank Dean	637	2.0	+0.3
Total formal votes		32,359	97.6	−0.4
Informal votes		802	2.4	+0.4
Turnout		33,161	94.2	−0.6
Two-party-preferred result
Liberal	Rob Maclellan	18,284	56.5	−4.6
Labor	John Anderson	14,059	43.5	+4.6
Liberal hold		Swing	−4.6	

=== Pascoe Vale ===
1999 Victorian state election: Pascoe Vale
Party	Candidate	Votes	%	±%
Labor	Christine Campbell	17,725	64.9	+4.9
Liberal	Valentine Aghajani	9,569	35.1	−2.9
Total formal votes		27,294	96.1	−0.9
Informal votes		1,098	3.9	+0.9
Turnout		28,392	91.5	
Labor hold		Swing	+3.8	

=== Polwarth ===
1999 Victorian state election: Polwarth
Party	Candidate	Votes	%	±%
Liberal	Terry Mulder	12,668	41.0	−10.0
Labor	Steve Gartland	7,393	23.9	−4.5
National	Paul Couch	5,116	16.6	+16.6
Independent	Brian Crook	4,574	14.8	−3.8
Greens	Sally-Anne Brown	1,161	3.8	+3.8
Total formal votes		30,912	97.8	−0.3
Informal votes		686	2.2	+0.3
Turnout		31,598	95.1	
Two-party-preferred result
Liberal	Terry Mulder	18,675	60.4	+2.3
Labor	Steve Gartland	12,237	39.6	−2.3
Liberal hold		Swing	+2.3	

=== Portland ===
1999 Victorian state election: Portland
Party	Candidate	Votes	%	±%
Liberal	Denis Napthine	12,093	44.4	−11.3
Labor	Lesley Ann Jackson	8,016	29.4	−5.1
Independent	Patrick Kempton	7,153	26.2	+26.2
Total formal votes		27,262	98.1	−0.2
Informal votes		515	1.9	+0.2
Turnout		27,777	95.3	
Two-party-preferred result
Liberal	Denis Napthine	14,868	54.5	−5.9
Labor	Lesley Ann Jackson	12,394	45.5	+5.9
Liberal hold		Swing	−5.9	

=== Prahran ===
1999 Victorian state election: Prahran
Party	Candidate	Votes	%	±%
Liberal	Leonie Burke	16,789	51.0	−1.8
Labor	Joseph O'Reilly	13,056	39.7	−3.9
Greens	Wendy Salter	2,282	6.9	+6.9
Democratic Labor	Frances Murphy	609	1.9	+1.9
Natural Law	Margaret Dawson	164	0.5	−3.1
Total formal votes		32,900	97.3	−0.4
Informal votes		904	2.7	+0.4
Turnout		33,804	86.5	
Two-party-preferred result
Liberal	Leonie Burke	17,785	54.0	−0.6
Labor	Joseph O'Reilly	15,126	46.0	+0.6
Liberal hold		Swing	−0.6	

=== Preston ===
1999 Victorian state election: Preston
Party	Candidate	Votes	%	±%
Labor	Michael Leighton	20,087	67.2	+3.3
Liberal	Ruth Padgett	8,769	29.3	−4.6
Natural Law	Michael Dickins	1,052	3.5	+1.2
Total formal votes		29,908	95.7	−0.1
Informal votes		1,339	4.3	+0.1
Turnout		31,247	92.5	
Two-party-preferred result
Labor	Michael Leighton	20,522	68.6	+3.3
Liberal	Ruth Padgett	9,384	31.4	−3.3
Labor hold		Swing	+3.3	

=== Richmond ===
1999 Victorian state election: Richmond
Party	Candidate	Votes	%	±%
Labor	Richard Wynne	20,121	57.4	−4.8
Liberal	Duc Dung Tran	10,716	30.6	+0.6
Independent	Stephen Jolly	4,213	12.0	+12.0
Total formal votes		35,050	96.3	−0.9
Informal votes		1,348	3.7	+0.9
Turnout		36,398	87.8	
Two-party-preferred result
Labor	Richard Wynne	23,204	66.2	−1.1
Liberal	Duc Dung Tran	11,837	33.8	+1.1
Labor hold		Swing	−1.1	

=== Ripon ===
1999 Victorian state election: Ripon
Party	Candidate	Votes	%	±%
Labor	Joe Helper	15,579	52.6	+8.8
Liberal	Steve Elder	14,045	47.4	−5.0
Total formal votes		29,624	97.8	−0.5
Informal votes		668	2.2	+0.5
Turnout		30,292	95.5	
Labor gain from Liberal		Swing	+7.2	

=== Rodney ===
1999 Victorian state election: Rodney
Party	Candidate	Votes	%	±%
National	Noel Maughan	18,329	60.8	−2.8
Labor	Malcolm McCullough	8,565	28.4	+8.7
One Nation	Dorothy Hutton	3,257	10.8	+10.8
Total formal votes		30,151	97.8	−0.6
Informal votes		692	2.2	+0.6
Turnout		30,843	94.8	
Two-party-preferred result
National	Noel Maughan	19,793	65.6	−10.5
Labor	Malcolm McCullough	10,358	34.4	+10.5
National hold		Swing	−10.5	

=== Sandringham ===
1999 Victorian state election: Sandringham
Party	Candidate	Votes	%	±%
Liberal	Murray Thompson	19,478	62.5	−0.3
Labor	Janice Munt	11,693	37.5	+3.2
Total formal votes		31,171	97.4	−0.9
Informal votes		828	2.6	+0.9
Turnout		31,999	92.4	
Liberal hold		Swing	−1.8	

=== Seymour ===
1999 Victorian state election: Seymour
Party	Candidate	Votes	%	±%
Liberal	Di Rule	15,675	47.7	−4.8
Labor	Ben Hardman	15,410	46.9	+2.9
Greens	Jim Romagnesi	1,797	5.5	+5.5
Total formal votes		32,882	97.4	−0.7
Informal votes		879	2.6	+0.7
Turnout		33,761	94.5	
Two-party-preferred result
Labor	Ben Hardman	16,672	50.7	+4.9
Liberal	Di Rule	16,210	49.3	−4.9
Labor gain from Liberal		Swing	+4.9	

=== Shepparton ===
1999 Victorian state election: Shepparton
Party	Candidate	Votes	%	±%
National	Don Kilgour	12,355	39.9	−26.0
Independent	Chris Hazelman	10,965	35.4	+35.4
Labor	Wendy Boyle	7,616	24.6	−3.2
Total formal votes		30,936	97.3	−0.3
Informal votes		865	2.7	+0.3
Turnout		31,801	94.0	
Two-party-preferred result
National	Don Kilgour	19,267	62.1	−7.4
Labor	Wendy Boyle	11,743	37.9	+7.4
Two-candidate-preferred result
National	Don Kilgour	16,724	54.1	−15.5
Independent	Chris Hazelman	14,212	45.9	+45.9
National hold		Swing	−15.5	

=== South Barwon ===
1999 Victorian state election: South Barwon
Party	Candidate	Votes	%	±%
Liberal	Alister Paterson	16,892	50.7	−8.4
Labor	Michael Crutchfield	12,468	37.4	−0.6
Democrats	Jeffrey Paull	1,891	5.7	+5.7
Greens	Stephen Chenery	1,233	3.7	+3.7
Independent	Tierry Lauren	598	1.8	+1.8
Independent	Michael Gannon	215	0.6	+0.6
Total formal votes		33,297	97.8	−0.4
Informal votes		761	2.2	+0.4
Turnout		34,058	94.3	
Two-party-preferred result
Liberal	Alister Paterson	18,222	54.7	−5.5
Labor	Michael Crutchfield	15,076	45.3	+5.5
Liberal hold		Swing	−5.5	

=== Springvale ===
1999 Victorian state election: Springvale
Party	Candidate	Votes	%	±%
Labor	Tim Holding	18,230	57.9	+2.9
Liberal	John Campbell	11,152	35.4	−2.7
Independent	Barbara Liu-Hyland	1,680	5.3	+5.3
Independent	Robert Bisset	398	1.3	+1.3
Total formal votes		31,460	95.5	−1.2
Informal votes		1,476	4.5	+1.2
Turnout		32,936	92.9	
Two-party-preferred result
Labor	Tim Holding	19,114	60.8	+2.9
Liberal	John Campbell	12,322	39.2	−2.9
Labor hold		Swing	+2.9	

=== Sunshine ===
1999 Victorian state election: Sunshine
Party	Candidate	Votes	%	±%
Labor	Telmo Languiller	19,826	58.8	−8.8
Liberal	Simon Morgan	9,100	27.0	−2.7
Independent	Ian Baker	4,780	14.2	+14.2
Total formal votes		33,706	94.4	−0.8
Informal votes		1,987	5.6	+0.8
Turnout		35,693	92.7	
Two-party-preferred result
Labor	Telmo Languiller	23,643	70.1	+1.0
Liberal	Simon Morgan	10,062	29.9	−1.0
Labor hold		Swing	+1.0	

=== Swan Hill ===
1999 Victorian state election: Swan Hill
Party	Candidate	Votes	%	±%
National	Barry Steggall	12,378	45.2	−13.8
Independent	Carl Ditterich	6,192	22.6	+22.6
Labor	Dallas Williams	5,511	20.1	+2.7
Independent	Bill Maher	1,435	5.2	+5.2
One Nation	Bill Croft	1,383	5.1	+5.1
Independent	Gerrit Schorel	257	0.9	+0.9
Independent	Leigh Bonney	219	0.8	+0.8
Total formal votes		27,375	96.3	−2.0
Informal votes		1,066	3.7	+2.0
Turnout		28,441	94.5	
Two-party-preferred result
National	Barry Steggall	16,864	61.4	−7.6
Labor	Dallas Williams	10,619	38.6	+7.6
Two-candidate-preferred result
National	Barry Steggall	14,450	52.8	−16.2
Independent	Carl Ditterich	12,925	47.2	+47.2
National hold		Swing	−16.2	

=== Thomastown ===
1999 Victorian state election: Thomastown
Party	Candidate	Votes	%	±%
Labor	Peter Batchelor	23,305	73.9	+3.0
Liberal	Michael Gidley	8,212	26.1	−1.3
Total formal votes		31,517	95.5	−1.0
Informal votes		1,479	4.5	+1.0
Turnout		32,996	93.2	
Labor hold		Swing	+1.9	

=== Tullamarine ===
1999 Victorian state election: Tullamarine
Party	Candidate	Votes	%	±%
Labor	Liz Beattie	18,346	50.6	+6.5
Liberal	Bernie Finn	15,561	42.9	−5.4
Greens	Pat Fraser	996	2.7	+2.7
Shooters	Russell Grenfell	719	2.0	+2.0
Democratic Labor	John Mulholland	668	1.8	+1.8
Total formal votes		36,290	96.8	−1.0
Informal votes		1,210	3.2	+1.0
Turnout		37,500	94.6	
Two-party-preferred result
Labor	Liz Beattie	19,502	53.8	+6.8
Liberal	Bernie Finn	16,751	46.2	−6.8
Labor gain from Liberal		Swing	+6.8	

=== Wantirna ===
1999 Victorian state election: Wantirna
Party	Candidate	Votes	%	±%
Liberal	Kim Wells	21,579	61.9	−0.3
Labor	Chrys Abraham	13,301	38.1	+2.3
Total formal votes		34,880	97.4	−0.6
Informal votes		931	2.6	+0.6
Turnout		35,811	94.3	
Liberal hold		Swing	−1.2	

=== Warrandyte ===
1999 Victorian state election: Warrandyte
Party	Candidate	Votes	%	±%
Liberal	Phil Honeywood	19,395	61.2	−0.2
Labor	David Orr	10,630	33.6	+3.2
Hope	Kate Stockdale	1,357	4.3	+4.3
Natural Law	Patti Roberts	288	0.9	−0.3
Total formal votes		31,670	98.1	−0.4
Informal votes		620	1.9	+0.4
Turnout		32,290	93.9	
Two-party-preferred result
Liberal	Phil Honeywood	20,096	63.5	−0.4
Labor	David Orr	11,571	36.5	+0.4
Liberal hold		Swing	−0.4	

=== Warrnambool ===
1999 Victorian state election: Warrnambool
Party	Candidate	Votes	%	±%
Liberal	John Vogels	12,739	40.2	+40.2
Labor	Roy Reekie	9,993	31.5	+2.9
National	Greg Walsh	5,550	17.5	−40.3
Independent	Maggie Lindop	1,864	5.9	−6.7
Greens	Gillian Blair	740	2.3	+2.3
Independent	Robert O'Brien	435	1.4	+1.4
Reform	Barry Wilson	379	1.2	+1.2
Total formal votes		31,700	97.1	−1.1
Informal votes		962	2.9	+1.1
Turnout		32,662	95.4	
Two-party-preferred result
Liberal	John Vogels	18,682	58.9	+58.9
Labor	Roy Reekie	13,018	41.1	+4.9
Liberal gain from National		Swing	N/A	

=== Werribee ===
1999 Victorian state election: Werribee
Party	Candidate	Votes	%	±%
Labor	Mary Gillett	22,652	59.1	+12.8
Liberal	David McLaren	14,120	36.9	−6.7
Greens	Cynthia Manson	913	2.4	+2.4
Independent	Gary Impson	353	0.9	+0.9
Independent	Batman Backhouse	258	0.7	+0.7
Total formal votes		38,296	96.9	−0.6
Informal votes		1,221	3.1	+0.6
Turnout		39,517	94.9	
Two-party-preferred result
Labor	Mary Gillett	23,540	61.5	+10.7
Liberal	David McLaren	14,754	38.5	−10.7
Labor hold		Swing	+10.7	

=== Williamstown ===
1999 Victorian state election: Williamstown
Party	Candidate	Votes	%	±%
Labor	Steve Bracks	20,468	66.7	+2.8
Liberal	Alan Evers-Buckland	8,877	28.9	−4.3
Independent	Noel Dyson	1,341	4.4	+4.4
Total formal votes		30,686	96.4	−0.2
Informal votes		1,155	3.6	+0.2
Turnout		31,841	92.3	
Two-party-preferred result
Labor	Steve Bracks	21,011	68.5	+2.9
Liberal	Alan Evers-Buckland	9,671	31.5	−2.9
Labor hold		Swing	+2.9	

=== Wimmera ===
1999 Victorian state election: Wimmera
Party	Candidate	Votes	%	±%
National	Hugh Delahunty	9,866	32.4	−24.5
Liberal	Garry Cross	9,450	31.1	+31.1
Labor	Les Power	7,230	23.8	+3.0
One Nation	Bob Mackley	1,630	5.4	+5.4
Independent	Doug Hallam	1,446	4.8	+4.8
Independent	Laurie Liston	792	2.6	+2.6
Total formal votes		30,414	97.2	−1.4
Informal votes		878	2.8	+1.4
Turnout		31,292	95.8	
Two-party-preferred result
National	Hugh Delahunty	19,850	65.1	−6.1
Labor	Les Power	10,648	34.9	+6.1
Two-candidate-preferred result
National	Hugh Delahunty	17,510	57.6	−13.6
Liberal	Garry Cross	12,904	42.4	+42.4
National hold		Swing	−13.6	

=== Yan Yean ===
1999 Victorian state election: Yan Yean
Party	Candidate	Votes	%	±%
Labor	Andre Haermeyer	18,265	51.6	+1.4
Liberal	Heather Tivendale	15,397	43.5	−3.7
Independent	Lynlee Smith	1,371	3.9	+3.9
Natural Law	Byron Rigby	341	1.0	−1.5
Total formal votes		35,374	97.1	−0.6
Informal votes		1,048	2.9	+0.6
Turnout		36,422	95.1	
Two-party-preferred result
Labor	Andre Haermeyer	19,170	54.2	+2.6
Liberal	Heather Tivendale	16,204	45.8	−2.6
Labor hold		Swing	+2.6	

== See also ==
- 1999 Victorian state election
- Candidates of the 1999 Victorian state election
- Members of the Victorian Legislative Assembly, 1999–2002
