= Members of the Victorian Legislative Assembly, 1996–1999 =

- ←1992–1996 1999–2002→

This is a list of members of the Victorian Legislative Assembly from 1996 to 1999, as elected at the 1996 state election:

Name	Party	Electorate	Term in office
Alex Andrianopoulos	Labor	Mill Park	1985–2002
Florian Andrighetto	Liberal	Narracan	1996–1999
Gordon Ashley	Liberal	Bayswater	1992–2002
Hon Ian Baker	Labor	Sunshine	1988–1999
Peter Batchelor	Labor	Thomastown	1990–2010
Steve Bracks	Labor	Williamstown	1994–2007
Hon Alan Brown ^{[1]}	Liberal	Gippsland West	1979–1996
John Brumby	Labor	Broadmeadows	1993–2010
Leonie Burke	Liberal	Prahran	1996–2002
Bob Cameron	Labor	Bendigo West	1996–2010
Christine Campbell	Labor	Pascoe Vale	1996–2014
Carlo Carli	Labor	Coburg	1994–2010
Robert Clark	Liberal	Box Hill	1988–2018
Neil Cole	Labor	Melbourne	1988–1999
Hon Geoff Coleman	Liberal	Bennettswood	1976–1982, 1985–1999
Robin Cooper	Liberal	Mornington	1985–2006
David Cunningham	Labor	Melton	1985–1999
Susan Davies ^{[1]}	Independent	Gippsland West	1997–2002
Dr Robert Dean	Liberal	Berwick	1992–2002
Mary Delahunty ^{[3]}	Labor	Northcote	1998–2006
Martin Dixon	Liberal	Dromana	1996–2018
Demetri Dollis	Labor	Richmond	1988–1999
Mary Douglas	Labor	Werribee	1996–2006
Robert Doyle	Liberal	Malvern	1992–2006
Lorraine Elliott	Liberal	Mooroolbark	1992–2002
Steve Elder	Liberal	Ripon	1988–1999
Bernie Finn	Liberal	Tullamarine	1992–1999
Sherryl Garbutt	Labor	Bundoora	1989–2006
Hon Phil Gude	Liberal	Hawthorn	1976–1979, 1985–1999
Andre Haermeyer	Labor	Yan Yean	1992–2008
Keith Hamilton	Labor	Morwell	1988–2002
Hon Ann Henderson	Liberal	Geelong	1992–1999
Hon Phil Honeywood	Liberal	Warrandyte	1988–2006
Rob Hulls	Labor	Niddrie	1996–2012
Ken Jasper	National	Murray Valley	1976–2010
Paul Jenkins	Liberal	Ballarat West	1992–1999
Hon Michael John	Liberal	Bendigo East	1985–1999
Hon Jeff Kennett	Liberal	Burwood	1976–1999
Don Kilgour	National	Shepparton	1991–2002
Lynne Kosky	Labor	Altona	1996–2010
Craig Langdon	Labor	Ivanhoe	1996–2010
David Lean	Liberal	Carrum	1996–1999
Geoff Leigh	Liberal	Mordialloc	1982–2002
Michael Leighton	Labor	Preston	1988–2006
Hong Lim	Labor	Clayton	1996–2018
Peter Loney	Labor	Geelong North	1992–2006
Hurtle Lupton	Liberal	Knox	1992–2002
Hon Rob Maclellan	Liberal	Pakenham	1970–2002
Judy Maddigan	Labor	Essendon	1996–2010
Noel Maughan	National	Rodney	1989–2006
Steve McArthur	Liberal	Monbulk	1992–2002
Andrea McCall	Liberal	Frankston	1996–2002
Denise McGill	Liberal	Oakleigh	1992–1999
Hon Bill McGrath	National	Wimmera	1979–1999
John McGrath	National	Warrnambool	1985–1999
Peter McLellan ^{[4]}	Liberal/Independent	Frankston East	1992–1999
Hon Pat McNamara	National	Benalla	1982–2000
Eddie Micallef	Labor	Springvale	1983–1999
Bruce Mildenhall	Labor	Footscray	1992–2006
Hon Dr Denis Napthine	Liberal	Portland	1988–2015
John Pandazopoulos	Labor	Dandenong	1992–2014
Alister Paterson	Liberal	South Barwon	1992–2002
David Perrin	Liberal	Bulleen	1985–1999
Victor Perton	Liberal	Doncaster	1988–2006
Inga Peulich	Liberal	Bentleigh	1992–2002
Hon Roger Pescott ^{[2]}	Liberal	Mitcham	1985–1997
Wayne Phillips	Liberal	Eltham	1992–2002
Hon Jim Plowman	Liberal	Evelyn	1973–1982, 1985–1999
Tony Plowman	Liberal	Benambra	1992–2006
Hon Tom Reynolds	Liberal	Gisborne	1979–1999
John Richardson	Liberal	Forest Hill	1976–2002
Tony Robinson ^{[2]}	Labor	Mitcham	1997–2010
Gary Rowe	Liberal	Cranbourne	1992–2002
Peter Ryan	National	Gippsland South	1992–2015
Russell Savage	Independent	Mildura	1996–2006
George Seitz	Labor	Keilor	1982–2010
Helen Shardey	Liberal	Caulfield	1996–2010
Hon Tony Sheehan ^{[3]}	Labor	Northcote	1982–1985, 1988–1998
Hon Ian Smith	Liberal	Polwarth	1967–1983, 1985–1999
Ross Smith	Liberal	Glen Waverley	1985–2002
Garry Spry	Liberal	Bellarine	1992–2002
Barry Steggall	National	Swan Hill	1983–2002
Hon Alan Stockdale	Liberal	Brighton	1985–1999
Hon Marie Tehan	Liberal	Seymour	1992–1999
Murray Thompson	Liberal	Sandringham	1992–2018
John Thwaites	Labor	Albert Park	1992–2007
Barry Traynor	Liberal	Ballarat East	1992–1999
David Treasure	National	Gippsland East	1992–1999
Hon Jan Wade	Liberal	Kew	1988–1999
Kim Wells	Liberal	Wantirna	1992–present
Jan Wilson	Labor	Dandenong North	1985–1999

^{1} In December 1996, the Liberal member for Gippsland West, Alan Brown, resigned. Independent candidate Susan Davies won the resulting by-election on 1 February 1997.
^{2} On 11 November 1997, the Liberal member for Mitcham, Roger Pescott, resigned. Labor candidate Tony Robinson won the resulting by-election on 13 December 1997.
^{3} On 3 July 1998, the Labor member for Northcote, Tony Sheehan, resigned. Labor candidate Mary Delahunty won the resulting state by-election on 15 August 1998.
^{4} The member for Frankston East, Peter McLellan, was elected as a member of the Liberal Party, but resigned on 24 July 1998 and subsequently served out the remainder of his term as an independent.
