= Members of the Victorian Legislative Assembly, 1999–2002 =

- ←1996–1999 2002–2006→

This is a list of members of the Victorian Legislative Assembly from 1999 to 2002, as elected at the 1999 state election:

| Name | Party | Electorate | Term in office |
|---|---|---|---|
| Jacinta Allan | Labor | Bendigo East | 1999–present |
| Denise Allen ^{[3]} | Labor | Benalla | 2000–2002 |
| Alex Andrianopoulos | Labor | Mill Park | 1985–2002 |
| Hon Louise Asher | Liberal | Brighton | 1999–2018 |
| Gordon Ashley | Liberal | Bayswater | 1992–2002 |
| Ted Baillieu | Liberal | Hawthorn | 1999–2014 |
| Ann Barker | Labor | Oakleigh | 1988–1992, 1999–2014 |
| Peter Batchelor | Labor | Thomastown | 1990–2010 |
| Liz Beattie | Labor | Tullamarine | 1999–2014 |
| Steve Bracks | Labor | Williamstown | 1994–2007 |
| John Brumby | Labor | Broadmeadows | 1993–2010 |
| Leonie Burke | Liberal | Prahran | 1996–2002 |
| Bob Cameron | Labor | Bendigo West | 1996–2010 |
| Christine Campbell | Labor | Pascoe Vale | 1996–2014 |
| Carlo Carli | Labor | Coburg | 1994–2010 |
| Robert Clark | Liberal | Box Hill | 1988–2018 |
| Hon Robin Cooper | Liberal | Mornington | 1985–2006 |
| Susan Davies | Independent | Gippsland West | 1997–2002 |
| Dr Robert Dean | Liberal | Berwick | 1992–2002 |
| Hugh Delahunty | National | Wimmera | 1999–2014 |
| Mary Delahunty | Labor | Northcote | 1998–2006 |
| Martin Dixon | Liberal | Dromana | 1996–2018 |
| Robert Doyle | Liberal | Malvern | 1992–2006 |
| Joanne Duncan | Labor | Gisborne | 1999–2014 |
| Lorraine Elliott | Liberal | Mooroolbark | 1992–2002 |
| Christine Fyffe | Liberal | Evelyn | 1999–2002, 2006–2018 |
| Sherryl Garbutt | Labor | Bundoora | 1989–2006 |
| Mary Gillett | Labor | Werribee | 1996–2006 |
| Andre Haermeyer | Labor | Yan Yean | 1992–2008 |
| Keith Hamilton | Labor | Morwell | 1988–2002 |
| Ben Hardman | Labor | Seymour | 1999–2010 |
| Joe Helper | Labor | Ripon | 1999–2014 |
| Tim Holding | Labor | Springvale | 1999–2013 |
| Hon Phil Honeywood | Liberal | Warrandyte | 1988–2006 |
| Geoff Howard | Labor | Ballarat East | 1999–2018 |
| Rob Hulls | Labor | Niddrie | 1996–2012 |
| Craig Ingram | Independent | Gippsland East | 1999–2010 |
| Ken Jasper | National | Murray Valley | 1976–2010 |
| Hon Jeff Kennett ^{[2]} | Liberal | Burwood | 1976–1999 |
| Don Kilgour | National | Shepparton | 1991–2002 |
| Lynne Kosky | Labor | Altona | 1996–2010 |
| Nicholas Kotsiras | Liberal | Bulleen | 1999–2014 |
| Craig Langdon | Labor | Ivanhoe | 1996–2010 |
| Telmo Languiller | Labor | Sunshine | 1999–2018 |
| Geoff Leigh | Liberal | Mordialloc | 1982–2002 |
| Michael Leighton | Labor | Preston | 1988–2006 |
| John Lenders | Labor | Dandenong North | 1999–2002 |
| Hong Lim | Labor | Clayton | 1996–2018 |
| Jenny Lindell | Labor | Carrum | 1999–2010 |
| Peter Loney | Labor | Geelong North | 1992–2006 |
| Hurtle Lupton | Liberal | Knox | 1992–2002 |
| Hon Rob Maclellan | Liberal | Pakenham | 1970–2002 |
| Judy Maddigan | Labor | Essendon | 1996–2010 |
| Noel Maughan | National | Rodney | 1989–2006 |
| Ian Maxfield | Labor | Narracan | 1999–2006 |
| Steve McArthur | Liberal | Monbulk | 1992–2002 |
| Andrea McCall | Liberal | Frankston | 1996–2002 |
| Andrew McIntosh | Liberal | Kew | 1999–2014 |
| Hon Pat McNamara ^{[3]} | National | Benalla | 1982–2000 |
| Bruce Mildenhall | Labor | Footscray | 1992–2006 |
| Terry Mulder | Liberal | Polwarth | 1999–2015 |
| Hon Dr Denis Napthine | Liberal | Portland | 1988–2015 |
| Don Nardella | Labor | Melton | 1999–2014 |
| Karen Overington | Labor | Ballarat West | 1999–2010 |
| John Pandazopoulos | Labor | Dandenong | 1992–2014 |
| Alister Paterson | Liberal | South Barwon | 1992–2002 |
| Victor Perton | Liberal | Doncaster | 1988–2006 |
| Inga Peulich | Liberal | Bentleigh | 1992–2002 |
| Wayne Phillips | Liberal | Eltham | 1992–2002 |
| Bronwyn Pike | Labor | Melbourne | 1999–2012 |
| Tony Plowman | Liberal | Benambra | 1992–2006 |
| John Richardson | Liberal | Forest Hill | 1976–2002 |
| Tony Robinson | Labor | Mitcham | 1997–2010 |
| Gary Rowe | Liberal | Cranbourne | 1992–2002 |
| Peter Ryan | National | Gippsland South | 1992–2015 |
| Russell Savage | Independent | Mildura | 1996–2006 |
| George Seitz | Labor | Keilor | 1982–2010 |
| Helen Shardey | Liberal | Caulfield | 1996–2010 |
| Ross Smith | Liberal | Glen Waverley | 1985–2002 |
| Garry Spry | Liberal | Bellarine | 1992–2002 |
| Barry Steggall | National | Swan Hill | 1983–2002 |
| Bob Stensholt ^{[2]} | Labor | Burwood | 1999–2010 |
| Murray Thompson | Liberal | Sandringham | 1992–2018 |
| John Thwaites | Labor | Albert Park | 1992–2007 |
| Ian Trezise | Labor | Geelong | 1999–2014 |
| Matt Viney ^{[1]} | Labor | Frankston East | 1999–2002 |
| John Vogels | Liberal | Warrnambool | 1999–2002 |
| Kim Wells | Liberal | Wantirna | 1992–present |
| Ron Wilson | Liberal | Bennettswood | 1999–2002 |
| Richard Wynne | Labor | Richmond | 1999–present |

^{1} The incumbent member for Frankston East, Liberal-turned-independent Peter McLellan, died on the morning of 18 September 1999, the day of the 1999 election. As a result, voting in the seat was discontinued later in the day, with the result instead to be decided in a by-election. The resulting by-election was won by Labor candidate Matt Viney on 16 October 1999.
^{2} On 3 November 1999, the Liberal member for Burwood and former Premier of Victoria, Jeff Kennett, resigned. Labor candidate Bob Stensholt won the resulting by-election on 11 December 1999.
^{3} On 16 December 1999, the National member for Benalla and former Deputy Premier of Victoria, Pat McNamara, resigned. Labor candidate Denise Allen won the resulting by-election on 13 May 2000.
