= Electoral results for the district of Knox =

Australian district election results

This is a list of electoral results for the Electoral district of Knox in Victorian state elections.

== Members for Knox ==
Member	Party	Term
Steve Crabb	Labor Party	1976–1992
Hurtle Lupton	Liberal Party	1992–2002

== Election results ==
=== Elections in the 1990s ===
1999 Victorian state election: Knox
Party	Candidate	Votes	%	±%
Liberal	Hurtle Lupton	20,481	56.0	−0.9
Labor	Christopher Smith	14,684	40.1	−0.1
Democratic Labor	Ken Wells	1,408	3.8	+3.8
Total formal votes		36,573	97.5	−0.5
Informal votes		943	2.5	+0.5
Turnout		37,516	94.3	−0.6
Two-party-preferred result
Liberal	Hurtle Lupton	20,962	57.3	−0.6
Labor	Christopher Smith	15,611	42.7	+0.6
Liberal hold		Swing	−0.6	

1996 Victorian state election: Knox
Party	Candidate	Votes	%	±%
Liberal	Hurtle Lupton	18,916	56.9	+6.7
Labor	Christopher Smith	13,376	40.2	+3.8
Natural Law	Leah Mandylas	951	2.9	+2.9
Total formal votes		33,243	98.0	+0.9
Informal votes		689	2.0	−0.9
Turnout		33,932	94.9	−1.0
Two-party-preferred result
Liberal	Hurtle Lupton	19,234	57.9	+1.8
Labor	Christopher Smith	13,981	42.1	−1.8
Liberal hold		Swing	+1.8	

1992 Victorian state election: Knox
Party	Candidate	Votes	%	±%
Liberal	Hurtle Lupton	15,281	50.2	+9.2
Labor	Carolyn Hirsh	11,081	36.4	−16.6
Independent	Peter Herbert	2,350	7.7	+7.7
Independent	Bill Johnson	1,725	5.7	+5.7
Total formal votes		30,437	97.0	+0.7
Informal votes		926	3.0	−0.7
Turnout		31,363	95.9	
Two-party-preferred result
Liberal	Hurtle Lupton	17,005	56.1	+11.1
Labor	Carolyn Hirsh	13,292	43.9	−11.1
Liberal gain from Labor		Swing	+11.1	

=== Elections in the 1980s ===
1988 Victorian state election: Knox
Party	Candidate	Votes	%	±%
Labor	Steve Crabb	14,173	53.27	−6.05
Liberal	Bruce Bingham	10,311	38.75	+1.84
Call to Australia	Kenneth Morgan	1,077	4.05	+4.05
Independent	Stephen Gillies	1,047	3.93	+3.93
Total formal votes		26,608	96.66	−1.21
Informal votes		918	3.34	+1.21
Turnout		27,526	93.45	−0.73
Two-party-preferred result
Labor	Steve Crabb	14,896	55.99	−4.63
Liberal	Bruce Bingham	11,709	44.01	+4.63
Labor hold		Swing	−4.63	

1985 Victorian state election: Knox
Party	Candidate	Votes	%	±%
Labor	Steve Crabb	15,236	59.3	+1.2
Liberal	Jill Hall	9,480	36.9	+1.9
Public Transport	Thomas Tyrer	967	3.8	+3.8
Total formal votes		25,683	97.9	
Informal votes		559	2.1	
Turnout		26,242	94.2	
Two-party-preferred result
Labor	Steve Crabb	15,769	61.4	−0.7
Liberal	Jill Hall	9,914	38.6	+0.7
Labor hold		Swing	−0.7	

1982 Victorian state election: Knox
Party	Candidate	Votes	%	±%
Labor	Steve Crabb	18,071	57.2	+1.1
Liberal	Peter Evans	11,272	35.7	−5.1
Democrats	Dennis Ryan	2,237	7.1	+7.1
Total formal votes		31,580	98.1	+0.4
Informal votes		621	1.9	−0.4
Turnout		32,201	95.3	+0.3
Two-party-preferred result
Labor	Steve Crabb	19,357	61.3	+2.9
Liberal	Peter Evans	12,223	38.7	−2.9
Labor hold		Swing	+2.9	

=== Elections in the 1970s ===
1979 Victorian state election: Knox
Party	Candidate	Votes	%	±%
Labor	Steve Crabb	16,187	56.1	+4.3
Liberal	Gerald Ashman	11,772	40.8	−7.9
Independent	Derek Kruse	922	3.2	+3.2
Total formal votes		28,881	97.7	+0.3
Informal votes		669	2.3	−0.3
Turnout		29,550	95.0	+2.5
Two-party-preferred result
Labor	Steve Crabb	16,876	58.4	+7.1
Liberal	Gerald Ashman	12,005	41.6	−7.1
Labor hold		Swing	+7.1	

1976 Victorian state election: Knox
Party	Candidate	Votes	%	±%
Labor	Steve Crabb	13,573	51.3	+5.7
Liberal	Bruce Fasham	12,874	48.7	+5.4
Total formal votes		26,447	97.4	
Informal votes		717	2.6	
Turnout		27,164	92.5	
Labor gain from Liberal		Swing	+2.1	
