= Electoral results for the district of Bulleen =

Victoria, Australia, district election results

This is a list of electoral results for the Electoral district of Bulleen in Victorian state elections.

== Members for Bulleen ==
Member	Party	Term
David Perrin	Liberal	1985–1999
Nicholas Kotsiras	Liberal	1999–2014
Matthew Guy	Liberal	2014–present

== Election results ==
=== 2022 ===
2022 Victorian state election: Bulleen
Party	Candidate	Votes	%	±%
Liberal	Matthew Guy	20,645	48.1	−3.6
Labor	Ian Rogers	14,052	32.7	−4.1
Greens	Kellie Stafford	4,576	10.7	−0.3
Freedom	Voula Patrikios	1,172	2.7	+2.7
Family First	Jason Stokes	1,014	2.4	+2.4
Animal Justice	Elnaz Jafari	867	2.0	+1.6
Independent	Sanjeev Sabhlok	419	1.0	+1.0
Independent	David Vincent	214	0.5	+0.5
Total formal votes		42,959	94.9	+1.4
Informal votes		2,326	5.1	−1.4
Turnout		45,285	89.7	+0.6
Two-party-preferred result
Liberal	Matthew Guy	24,030	55.9	+0.4
Labor	Ian Rogers	18,929	44.1	−0.4
Liberal hold		Swing	+0.4	

=== 2018 ===
2018 Victorian state election: Bulleen
Party	Candidate	Votes	%	±%
Liberal	Matthew Guy	19,441	52.18	−4.02
Labor	Fiona Mackenzie	13,597	36.50	+6.18
Greens	Chris Kearney	4,219	11.32	+1.55
Total formal votes		37,257	93.37	−1.73
Informal votes		2,646	6.63	+1.73
Turnout		39,903	90.46	−2.88
Two-party-preferred result
Liberal	Matthew Guy	20,826	55.77	−4.79
Labor	Fiona Mackenzie	16,518	44.23	+4.79
Liberal hold		Swing	−4.79	

=== 2014 ===
2014 Victorian state election: Bulleen
Party	Candidate	Votes	%	±%
Liberal	Matthew Guy	21,983	56.2	−3.7
Labor	Adam Rundell	11,859	30.3	+3.4
Greens	Ben Cronly	3,824	9.8	+0.9
Christians	Eleni Arapoglou	1,452	3.7	+3.7
Total formal votes		39,118	95.1	−0.0
Informal votes		2,018	4.9	+0.0
Turnout		41,136	93.3	+0.3
Two-party-preferred result
Liberal	Matthew Guy	23,699	60.6	−4.5
Labor	Adam Rundell	15,438	39.4	+4.5
Liberal hold		Swing	−4.5	

=== 2010 ===
2010 Victorian state election: Bulleen
Party	Candidate	Votes	%	±%
Liberal	Nicholas Kotsiras	18,849	59.52	+6.82
Labor	Ivan Reid	8,533	26.95	−6.63
Greens	Fiona Mackenzie	2,712	8.56	−0.12
Family First	Kevin Tan	1,030	3.25	−1.79
Independent	Kelvin Eldridge	542	1.71	+1.71
Total formal votes		31,666	95.16	−0.76
Informal votes		1,611	4.84	+0.76
Turnout		33,277	93.77	−0.39
Two-party-preferred result
Liberal	Nicholas Kotsiras	20,509	64.68	+6.25
Labor	Ivan Reid	11,199	35.32	−6.25
Liberal hold		Swing	+6.25	

=== 2006 ===
2006 Victorian state election: Bulleen
Party	Candidate	Votes	%	±%
Liberal	Nicholas Kotsiras	16,518	52.70	+3.07
Labor	Neill Campbell	10,526	33.58	−6.21
Greens	Fiona MacKenzie	2,719	8.68	−1.91
Family First	Carmen Tong	1,579	5.04	+5.04
Total formal votes		31,342	95.94	−0.64
Informal votes		1,325	4.06	+0.64
Turnout		32,667	94.16	+0.66
Two-party-preferred result
Liberal	Nicholas Kotsiras	18,182	58.43	+5.79
Labor	Neill Campbell	12,935	41.57	−5.79
Liberal hold		Swing	+5.79	

=== 2002 ===
2002 Victorian state election: Bulleen
Party	Candidate	Votes	%	±%
Liberal	Nicholas Kotsiras	15,612	49.6	−10.2
Labor	Chris Miras	12,517	39.8	+8.2
Greens	Matthew Wright	3,330	10.6	+4.8
Total formal votes		31,459	96.6	−0.4
Informal votes		1,115	3.4	+0.4
Turnout		32,574	93.5	
Two-party-preferred result
Liberal	Nicholas Kotsiras	16,561	52.6	−10.0
Labor	Chris Miras	14,898	47.4	+10.0
Liberal hold		Swing	−10.0	

=== 1999 ===
1999 Victorian state election: Bulleen
Party	Candidate	Votes	%	±%
Liberal	Nicholas Kotsiras	17,843	58.7	−4.7
Labor	Chris Miras	9,810	32.3	−1.1
Greens	Robert Trafficante	1,832	6.0	+6.0
Hope	Damian Manassa	890	2.9	+2.9
Total formal votes		30,375	96.9	−0.5
Informal votes		982	3.1	+0.5
Turnout		31,357	92.9	
Two-party-preferred result
Liberal	Nicholas Kotsiras	18,709	61.6	−3.0
Labor	Chris Miras	11,662	38.4	+3.0
Liberal hold		Swing	−3.0	

=== 1996 ===
1996 Victorian state election: Bulleen
Party	Candidate	Votes	%	±%
Liberal	David Perrin	19,331	63.4	−4.8
Labor	Peter De Angelis	10,169	33.3	+1.6
Natural Law	Susan Brown	992	3.3	+3.3
Total formal votes		30,492	97.4	+1.6
Informal votes		815	2.6	−1.6
Turnout		31,307	94.9	
Two-party-preferred result
Liberal	David Perrin	19,674	64.6	−3.6
Labor	Peter De Angelis	10,793	35.4	+3.6
Liberal hold		Swing	−3.6	

=== 1992 ===
1992 Victorian state election: Bulleen
Party	Candidate	Votes	%	±%
Liberal	David Perrin	20,200	68.2	+9.0
Labor	Peter De Angelis	9,399	31.8	−9.0
Total formal votes		29,599	95.8	+0.3
Informal votes		1,300	4.2	−0.3
Turnout		30,899	95.3	
Liberal hold		Swing	+9.0	

=== 1988 ===
1988 Victorian state election: Bulleen
Party	Candidate	Votes	%	±%
Liberal	David Perrin	16,588	59.22	+1.43
Labor	David Redfearn	11,424	40.78	−1.43
Total formal votes		28,012	95.54	−1.77
Informal votes		1,308	4.46	+1.77
Turnout		29,320	92.86	−1.23
Liberal hold		Swing	+1.43	

=== 1985 ===
1985 Victorian state election: Bulleen
Party	Candidate	Votes	%	±%
Liberal	David Perrin	15,645	57.8	+7.9
Labor	John Scomparin	11,429	42.2	+0.4
Total formal votes		27,074	97.3	
Informal votes		749	2.7	
Turnout		27,823	94.1	
Liberal hold		Swing	+3.4	
