= Electoral results for the district of Dandenong North =

Victoria, Australia, district election results

This is a list of electoral results for the Electoral district of Dandenong North in Victorian state elections.

== Members for Dandenong North ==
Member	Party	Term
Jan Wilson	Labor Party	1985–1999
John Lenders	Labor Party	1999–2002

== Election results ==
=== Elections in the 1990s ===
1999 Victorian state election: Dandenong North
Party	Candidate	Votes	%	±%
Labor	John Lenders	16,406	53.9	+3.3
Liberal	George Emmanouil	11,908	39.2	−6.8
Independent	Greg Harris	1,820	6.0	+6.0
Reform	Fred Klimek	276	0.9	+0.9
Total formal votes		30,410	95.9	−1.1
Informal votes		1,302	4.1	+1.1
Turnout		31,712	93.8	−0.5
Two-party-preferred result
Labor	John Lenders	17,634	58.0	+5.8
Liberal	George Emmanouil	12,775	42.0	−5.8
Labor hold		Swing	+5.8	

1996 Victorian state election: Dandenong North
Party	Candidate	Votes	%	±%
Labor	Jan Wilson	15,385	50.6	+0.6
Liberal	John Kelly	13,982	46.0	−3.9
Call to Australia	Ian Wills	600	2.0	+2.0
Natural Law	David McLennan	431	1.4	+1.4
Total formal votes		30,398	97.0	+2.4
Informal votes		949	3.0	−2.4
Turnout		31,347	94.3	−1.0
Two-party-preferred result
Labor	Jan Wilson	15,868	52.2	+2.1
Liberal	John Kelly	14,507	47.8	−2.1
Labor hold		Swing	+2.1	

1992 Victorian state election: Dandenong North
Party	Candidate	Votes	%	±%
Labor	Jan Wilson	14,673	50.1	−8.0
Liberal	Maree Luckins	14,637	49.9	+8.0
Total formal votes		29,310	94.5	+1.3
Informal votes		1,690	5.5	−1.3
Turnout		31,000	95.3	
Labor hold		Swing	−8.0	

=== Elections in the 1980s ===
1988 Victorian state election: Dandenong North
Party	Candidate	Votes	%	±%
Labor	Jan Wilson	14,824	58.05	−1.06
Liberal	Peter McNeil	10,713	41.95	+1.06
Total formal votes		25,537	93.14	−3.38
Informal votes		1,882	6.86	+3.38
Turnout		27,419	92.16	−2.21
Labor hold		Swing	−1.06	

1985 Victorian state election: Dandenong North
Party	Candidate	Votes	%	±%
Labor	Jan Wilson	15,436	59.1	+0.6
Liberal	George Grech	10,679	40.9	+3.3
Total formal votes		26,115	96.5	
Informal votes		942	3.5	
Turnout		27,057	94.4	
Labor hold		Swing	−2.6	
