= Electoral results for the district of Frankston East =

Australian district election results

This is a list of electoral results for the Electoral district of Frankston East in Victorian state elections.

== Members for Frankston East ==
Member	Party	Term
Peter McLellan	Liberal	1992–1998
Peter McLellan	Independent	1998–1999
Matt Viney	Labor	1999–2002

== Election results ==
=== Elections in the 1990s ===
1999 Frankston East state supplementary election
Party	Candidate	Votes	%	±%
Labor	Matt Viney	13,127	51.4	+7.0
Liberal	Cherie McLean	10,632	41.6	−7.3
Greens	Mervyn Vogt	486	1.9	+1.9
Independent	Graham Eames	319	1.2	+1.2
Independent	Jason Coppard	263	1.0	+1.0
Independent	Garry Burleigh	140	0.5	+0.5
Independent	Scott Rankin	131	0.5	+0.5
Independent	Robert Anderson	95	0.4	+0.4
Democratic Labor	Pat Crea	93	0.4	+0.4
Independent	Malcolm McClure	77	0.3	+0.3
Independent	Ian Bunyan	72	0.3	+0.3
Independent	David Dawn	58	0.2	+0.2
Natural Law	Lawrence Clarke	24	0.1	−1.0
Independent	Geoff Clark	21	0.1	+0.1
Independent	Ivan Pavlekov-Smith	13	0.1	+0.1
Independent	Raymond Hoser	11	0.1	+0.1
Total formal votes		25,562	95.2	−2.6
Informal votes		1,280	4.8	+2.6
Turnout		26,842	93.0	−1.3
Two-party-preferred result
Labor	Matt Viney	13,953	54.6	+7.7
Liberal	Cherie McLean	11,603	45.4	−7.7
Labor gain from Liberal		Swing	+7.7	

1996 Victorian state election: Frankston East
Party	Candidate	Votes	%	±%
Liberal	Peter McLellan	13,085	48.9	+2.3
Labor	Colin Hampton	11,852	44.3	+0.7
Independent	Marianne Meehan	1,511	5.6	+5.6
Natural Law	Myrna Vanderloo	300	1.1	+1.1
Total formal votes		26,748	97.8	+2.1
Informal votes		590	2.2	−2.1
Turnout		27,338	94.3	−1.9
Two-party-preferred result
Liberal	Peter McLellan	14,192	53.1	+2.9
Labor	Colin Hampton	12,529	46.9	−2.9
Liberal hold		Swing	+2.9	

1992 Victorian state election: Frankston East
Party	Candidate	Votes	%	±%
Liberal	Peter McLellan	12,470	46.6	+5.9
Labor	Jane Hill	11,661	43.6	−11.1
Pensioner and CIR	Ray Stirling	770	2.9	+2.9
Independent	David Taylor	669	2.5	+2.5
Independent	Mike Toldy	657	2.5	−2.1
Independent	Greg Graham	542	2.0	+2.0
Total formal votes		26,769	95.7	−0.6
Informal votes		1,197	4.3	+0.6
Turnout		27,966	96.2	
Two-party-preferred result
Liberal	Peter McLellan	13,407	50.2	+6.7
Labor	Jane Hill	13,276	49.8	−6.7
Liberal gain from Labor		Swing	+6.7	
