= 1999 Frankston East state supplementary election =

- 16 October 1999
- Turnout: 93.0% ▼1.3%

	First party	Second party
Candidate	Matt Viney	Cherie McLean
Party	Labor	Liberal
Popular vote	13,127	10,632
Percentage	51.4%	41.6%
Swing	▲7.0	▼7.3
TPP	54.6%	45.4%
TPP swing	▲7.7	▼7.7
MP before election
Peter McLellan
Independent
Elected MP
Matt Viney
Labor

The 1999 Frankston East state supplementary election was held on 16 October 1999 to elect the next member for the electoral district of Frankston East in the Victorian Legislative Assembly, following the death of sitting MP Peter McLellan on the day of the 1999 Victorian state election.

== Background ==
McLellan was elected as a member of the Liberal Party in 1992, but resigned from the party in July 1998 to sit as an independent.

On the day of the state election on 18 September 1999, McLellan died in Frankston, meaning the election in Frankston East was declared 'failed'.

Initial counting on election night had the Coalition on 43 seats in the 88-seat chamber, Labor on 41 (including winning the seat of Geelong by just 16 votes), and independents on three.

Regardless of who won in Frankston East, neither the Coalition nor Labor could form a government without the support of the independents, leaving them in a position to effectively choose the next premier.

Independent MPs Russell Savage, Craig Ingram and Susan Davies adopted a united stand and released a charter of their demands which the parties would need to accept to further negotiate. Labor accepted all of them while the Coalition accepted all but two, saying that the Upper House should only be reformed after a referendum and rejecting outright an enquiry into the effects of privatisation. The independents announced that they would announce their decision after the supplementary election in Frankston East, which was to be held on 16 October and now assumed a crucial role.

Ahead of the supplementary election, polling had shown that Labor would likely win the seat.

The votes that were cast in Frankston East on the day of the election and McLellan's death had been destroyed without being counted. It is therefore unknown whether Frankston East voters had voted differently in the supplementary election than the way they voted at the general election.

== Results ==
The supplementary election resulted in a 7.71% swing to Labor, with its candidate Matt Viney winning 54.6% of the two-party preferred vote, putting Labor on 42 seats.

1999 Frankston East state supplementary election
Party	Candidate	Votes	%	±%
Labor	Matt Viney	13,127	51.4	+7.0
Liberal	Cherie McLean	10,632	41.6	−7.3
Greens	Mervyn Vogt	486	1.9	+1.9
Independent	Graham Eames	319	1.2	+1.2
Independent	Jason Coppard	263	1.0	+1.0
Independent	Garry Burleigh	140	0.5	+0.5
Independent	Scott Rankin	131	0.5	+0.5
Independent	Robert Anderson	95	0.4	+0.4
Democratic Labor	Pat Crea	93	0.4	+0.4
Independent	Malcolm McClure	77	0.3	+0.3
Independent	Ian Bunyan	72	0.3	+0.3
Independent	David Dawn	58	0.2	+0.2
Natural Law	Lawrence Clarke	24	0.1	−1.0
Independent	Geoff Clark	21	0.1	+0.1
Independent	Ivan Pavlekov-Smith	13	0.1	+0.1
Independent	Raymond Hoser	11	0.1	+0.1
Total formal votes		25,562	95.2	−2.6
Informal votes		1,280	4.8	+2.6
Turnout		26,842	93.0	−1.3
Two-party-preferred result
Labor	Matt Viney	13,953	54.6	+7.7
Liberal	Cherie McLean	11,603	45.4	−7.7
Labor gain from Liberal		Swing	+7.7	

== Aftermath ==
The following morning, Labor and the independents signed an agreement which became public the following day. Although this allowed Labor to form government by one seat, Kennett's supporters urged the Coalition to force a last-ditch confidence vote on the floor of the Assembly. They believed that Savage, Davies and Ingram would be forced to publicly support Premier Jeff Kennett. In truth, Savage and Davies felt that Kennett had given them short shrift during the previous term, and would not have even considered supporting any government led by Kennett. However, with the Liberals divided on Kennett's future role, Kennett resigned as premier and retired from politics.
