= David Perrin =

Australian politician

David John Perrin (born 29 March 1944) is a former Australian politician.

He was born in Geelong, Victoria, to Thomas Perrin and Winifred, née Clarke. An accountant with a Bachelor of Business in Accounting from the Royal Melbourne Institute of Technology, he was involved in the Liberal Party for many years, joining the Brunswick Young Liberals in 1967. He was secretary of the Victorian Dairy Industry Authority from 1983 to 1985, when he was elected to the Victorian Legislative Assembly as the member for Bulleen. In 1988 he was appointed Secretary of Shadow Cabinet, moving to the front bench as Shadow Minister for Ethnic Affairs, the Aged and Youth Affairs in 1989. He stood down from the front bench in 1991 and remained a backbencher for the rest of his career. He lost preselection for the 1999 state election and retired from politics.

He was an outspoken conservative backbencher during the Kennett government, opposing Kennett on drug reform, euthanasia, and gay and lesbian anti-discrimination laws. In 1999, Perrin lost Liberal preselection to former Kennett adviser Nicholas Kotsiras in a bitter contest which saw numerous claims of branch stacking.

Victorian Legislative Assembly
New seat	Member for Bulleen; 1985–1999	Succeeded by Nicholas Kotsiras
