= Jan Wilson (Australian politician) =

Australian politician (1939–2010)

Jan Wilson AM
- Born: 28 July 1939
- Died: 5 March 2010 (aged 70)

Janet Tindale Calder Wilson OAM (28 July 1939 – 5 March 2010) was an Australian politician.

Wilson was educated at Graeme High School in Falkirk, Scotland. After moving to Australia she became involved with the Labor Party, serving as secretary to federal Holt MP Max Oldmeadow from 1972 to 1975. From 1975 she was executive officer for Westernport Regional Council, but from 1978 she was a state party organiser and Dandenong City Councillor.

In 1985 Wilson was elected to the Victorian Legislative Assembly as the member for Dandenong North. In 1992 she was promoted to the front bench as Shadow Minister for Local Government and the Aged, trading Local Government for Consumer Affairs in 1993 and Racing in 1994. In 1995 she was moved to the new portfolio of Sport, Recreation and Racing, but she stood down in 1996 and retired from politics in 1999. Subsequent to her retirement she was chair of the board of Greyhound Racing Victoria. Wilson was appointed a Member of the Order of Australia in the 2009 Queen's Birthday Honours.

Wilson died in 2010.

In 2017, she was posthumously inducted onto the Victorian Honour Roll of Women.

Victorian Legislative Assembly
New seat	Member for Dandenong North; 1985–1999	Succeeded by John Lenders
