= Steve Crabb =

Australian politician (born 1943)

Steven Marshall Crabb (born 15 January 1943) is an Australian former politician.

He was born in Arbroath in Scotland, the son of Steven Crabb, an RAF warrant officer, and Gertrude. He attended local state schools and joined the Labour Party, of which he was an office-bearer. He emigrated to Australia in June 1966, joining the Colonial Mutual Life Assurance Society as joint assistant actuary in 1972. He joined the Labor Party and was a member of the federal executive of the Australian Insurance Employees Union from 1966 to 1970 and from 1972 to 1976, serving as vice-president for the latter period. In 1976 he was elected to the Victorian Legislative Assembly as the member for Knox. He was promoted to the ministry in 1982 as Minister of Transport, adding Industrial Affairs in 1983. In 1985 he became Minister for Employment and Industrial Affairs, subsequently moving to Labour (1986–88), Police and Emergency Services (1987–90), Tourism (1988–92), Conservation and Environment (1990–92) and Water Resources (1992). He retired from politics in 1992.

Victorian Legislative Assembly
New seat	Member for Knox; 1976–1992	Succeeded by Hurtle Lupton
