= John Lenders =

Australian politician

John Lenders JP

Member of the Victorian Legislative Council
- In office 30 November 2002 – 29 November 2014
- Constituency: Southern Metropolitan Region

Treasurer of Victoria
- In office 3 August 2007 – 2 December 2010
- Preceded by: John Brumby
- Succeeded by: Kim Wells

Victorian Minister for Education
- In office 1 December 2006 – 8 August 2007
- Preceded by: Lynne Kosky
- Succeeded by: Bronwyn Pike

Personal details
- Born: 1 October 1958 (age 67) Warragul, Victoria
- Party: Labor Party

John Lenders (born 1 October 1958) is an Australian politician. He represented the Southern Metropolitan Region in the Victorian Legislative Council. He was most notably the Minister for Education in the Bracks Government and Treasurer of Victoria in the Brumby Government.

He was appointed Treasurer in August 2007 following the appointment of Premier John Brumby and was succeeded on 3 December 2010 after the election of the Baillieu Government. Lenders also served as the Leader of the Government in the Legislative Council during the tenure of the Labor Government.

He was the Leader of the Opposition in the Legislative Council from 2010 to 2014 and held a number of shadow ministries.

Lenders retired at the 2014 Victorian state election.

== Prior positions ==
Lenders entered parliament in September 1999, as the MLA for Dandenong North. During this period, he served as the Parliamentary Secretary for Treasury and Finance.

He was then elected, in the subsequent 2002 election, MLC for Waverley. As Minister for Industrial Relations, in 2002 he championed the Federal Awards (Uniform System) Bill, which sought to provide Federal award employment protection to Victoria's non-award covered workers, which was passed by Parliament in 2003.

Lenders was also made Minister for Consumer Affairs and Minister for Finance in 2002 - portfolios he occupied until 2005 and 2006 respectively. In January, 2005, he was made Minister for Major Projects, Minister for WorkCover and the TAC which he occupied until December 2006.

Lenders was elected as MLC for Southern Metropolitan Region in November 2006. In December of the same year, he was promoted to Minister for Education. On 3 August 2007 Lenders was again promoted to Treasurer, following the resignation of Premier Steve Bracks, becoming the first sitting Legislative Council member to serve as treasurer. Due to his status as a member of the Legislative Council, and owing to the constitutional requirement that money bills originate from the lower house, as well as the convention that the treasurer be present during debate on the budget and other financial legislation, Lenders had to be formally voted into the lower house to deliver his budget speeches.

Prior to his election to the Victorian State Parliament in 1999, he was Assistant State Secretary 1988 and later State Secretary and Campaign Director of the Victorian ALP in 1994. During this time, he was also a member of the National Executive and Campaign Committee.

== Family ==
Lenders is the son of dairy farmers from Gippsland, and is married with three children. He grew up in regional Victoria, before moving to Melbourne for tertiary education.

== Education ==
Lenders attended Drouin East Primary School in 1963. He then moved to St Joseph's Primary School in Trafalgar until graduation in 1969.

Lenders studied education at Rusden Teachers College after graduating from Trafalgar High School; before going on to study law at Monash University

== Memberships ==
Lenders is a member of the Labor Party and has previously served as its State Secretary and campaign director.

Lenders is also a member of the Australian Services Union; Bicycle Victoria; and is a fellow of the Williamson Community Leadership Program.

In September 2010 Lenders was awarded Honorary Life Membership of the Proportional Representation Society of Australia in recognition of his commitment to reform of the Victorian Legislative Council, which he oversaw in the lead-up to and following the Labor Government's re-election in 2002.
