= Matt Viney =

Australian politician

Member of the Victorian Legislative Assembly for Frankston East
- In office 16 October 1999 – 30 November 2002

Member of the Victorian Legislative Council for Chelsea Province
- In office 30 November 2002 – 25 November 2006

Member of the Victorian Legislative Council for Eastern Victoria Region
- In office 25 November 2006 – 29 November 2014

Personal details
- Born: 28 July 1954 Melbourne, Victoria
- Died: 27 October 2026 (aged 72)
- Party: Labor

Matthew Shaw Viney (28 July 1954 - 27 October 2026) was an Australian politician who served in both houses of the Parliament of Victoria.

Viney was first elected to the electoral district of Frankston East electorate at the 1999 supplementary election, which was one of the factors in Steve Bracks winning a minority government. Frankston East was abolished at the following election, and Viney was elected to Chelsea Province in the Legislative Council. In 2006, Viney was elected to the Eastern Victoria Region following the electoral reform of the upper house.

In October 2013, Viney suffered a minor stroke, which led to his retirement from politics at the 2014 state election.

Viney was a supporter of the Collingwood Football Club and was chosen to head the 2008 Victorian Spirit of ANZAC Prize.

Victorian Legislative Assembly
Preceded by Peter McLellan	Member for Frankston East; 1999–2002	Succeeded by Seat abolished
Victorian Legislative Council
Preceded by Cameron Boardman	Member for Chelsea Province; 2002–2006; With: Bob Smith	Succeeded by Seat abolished
Preceded by Seat created	Member for Eastern Victoria Region; 2006–2014; With: Davis, O'Donohue, Hall, Scheffer	Succeeded by Daniel Mulino; Harriet Shing
