= Nicholas Kotsiras =

Australian politician

The Honourable Nicholas Kotsiras MP

Member of the Victorian Legislative Assembly for Bulleen
- In office 18 September 1999 – 29 November 2014
- Preceded by: David Perrin
- Succeeded by: Matthew Guy

Personal details
- Born: 13 March 1959 (age 67) Greece
- Party: Liberal Party
- Children: 3
- Profession: Teacher

Nicholas Kotsiras (born 13 March 1959, in Greece) is an Australian politician, and was a member of the Victorian Legislative Assembly for the Liberal Party from 1999 to 2014. He was first elected after defeating former member David Perrin for Liberal preselection in 1999.

Kotsiras worked as Ministerial Adviser to Jeff Kennett from 1992 to 1999.

Kotsiras is a Collingwood Magpies and a South Melbourne FC supporter.

Victorian Legislative Assembly
Preceded by David Perrin	Member for Bulleen; 1999–2014	Succeeded by Matthew Guy
