= Hurtle Lupton =

Australian politician

Hurtle Reginald Lupton (born 27 October 1939) is an Australian former politician. He was the Liberal member for Knox in the Victorian Legislative Assembly from 1992 to 2002.

Lupton was born in Melbourne to John Hurtle Charles Lupton and Wilhelmina Stephens. He was educated at Upwey High School from 1951 to 1954, leaving school early. On 15 September 1962 he married Dawn Yvonne Taylor, with whom he had three children. He completed his high school education at Box Hill High School 1968–69, and studied at Swinburne Technical College for a Certificate of Business Studies 1971–73. He worked as a computer programmer from 1968 until 1980.

In 1973 he was elected to Knox City Council, serving three terms (1979–80, 1981–82, 1989–90) as mayor. In 1991 he joined the Liberal Party.

In 1992, Lupton was selected as the Liberal candidate for the Victorian Legislative Assembly seat of Knox, which he duly won. He remained a backbencher throughout the term of the Kennett Government and did not serve on the shadow front bench after the Coalition's defeat in 1999. In 2002, Knox was abolished and Lupton contested Ferntree Gully, but was defeated.

Parliament of Victoria
Preceded by Steve Crabb	Member for Knox; 1992–2002	Succeeded by Seat abolished
