= Electoral district of Knox =

Former state electoral district of Victoria, Australia

Knox Victoria—Legislative Assembly
- State: Victoria
- Created: 1976
- Abolished: 2002
- Namesake: City of Knox
- Demographic: Metropolitan
- Coordinates: 37°53′S 145°13′E

Electoral district of Knox was an electoral district of the Legislative Assembly in the Australian state of Victoria.

== Members for Knox ==
Member	Party	Term
Steve Crabb	Labor	1976–1992
Hurtle Lupton	Liberal	1992–2002
