= 1999 Victorian state election =

Australian state election

- 18 September 1999 (Note: The supplementary election for Frankston East was held on 16 October 1999.)

All 88 seats in the Victorian Legislative Assembly and 22 (of the 44) seats in the Victorian Legislative Council 45 seats needed for a majority
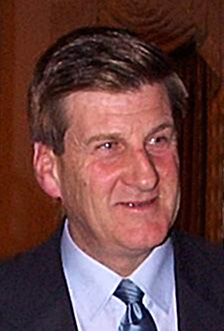

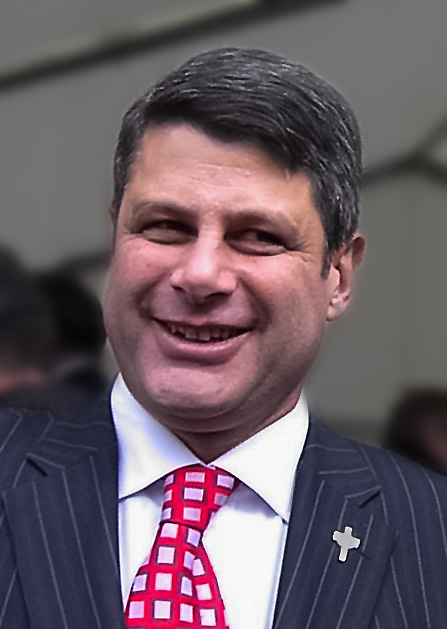
	First party	Second party
Leader	Jeff Kennett	Steve Bracks
Party	Liberal/National coalition	Labor
Leader since	23 April 1991	22 March 1999
Leader's seat	Burwood	Williamstown
Last election	58 seats	29 seats
Seats won	43	42
Seat change	▼15	▲13
Popular vote	1,330,928	1,289,696
Percentage	47.02%	45.57%
Swing	▼3.46	▲2.44
TPP	49.80%	50.20%
TPP swing	▼3.66	▲3.66
- Results in each electorate.
Premier before election
Jeff Kennett
Liberal/National coalition
Elected Premier
Steve Bracks
Labor

The 1999 Victorian state election was held on Saturday 18 September 1999 to elect the 54th Parliament of Victoria. All 88 members of the state's Legislative Assembly and 22 members of the 44-member Legislative Council were up for election. The Liberal–National Coalition led by Jeff Kennett and Pat McNamara, which had held majority government since the 1992 election, lost 15 seats and its majority due mainly to a swing against it in rural and regional Victoria.

The Labor Party, led by Steve Bracks, although also not having majority of the seats, took government due to support from three rural independents. They decided to back the Labor Party, which gave a working majority in the chamber to a Labor minority government. Bracks was sworn in as Premier of Victoria on 20 October 1999.

Future Premiers Jacinta Allan and Ted Baillieu entered parliament at this election.

== Results ==
=== Legislative Assembly ===
Party	Votes	%	+/–	Seats	+/–
Labor	1,289,696	45.57	▲2.44	42	▲13
Liberal	1,194,998	42.22	▼1.77	36	▼13
National	135,930	4.80	▼1.69	7	▼2
Greens	32,570	1.15	New	0	Steady
Hope	10,894	0.38	New	0	Steady
One Nation	8,181	0.29	New	0	Steady
Democrats	7,972	0.28	New	0	Steady
Democratic Labour	6,183	0.22	New	0	Steady
Natural Law	6,044	0.21	▼1.65	0	Steady
Shooters	2,011	0.07	▲0.03	0	Steady
Reform	1,483	0.05	New	0	Steady
Christian Democrats	414	0.01	▼0.21	0	Steady
Independents	133,701	4.72	▲1.12	3	▲2
Total	2,830,077	100.00	–	88	–
Valid votes	2,830,077	97.49			
Invalid/blank votes	72,800	2.51	▲0.28		
Total votes	2,902,877	100.00	–		
Registered voters/turnout	3,130,338	92.73	▲0.13		
Two-party-preferred
Labor	1,420,775	50.20	▲3.66		
Liberal/National Coalition	1,409,567	49.80	▼3.66		
Total	2,830,342	100.00	–		

=== Legislative Council ===
Results for the Legislative Council.

The following voting statistics exclude the three mid-term by-elections held on the same day, at which two seats were retained by Labor and a third was gained by Labor from the Liberals.

Victorian state election, 18 September 1999 Legislative Council
Enrolled voters	3,130,338				
Votes cast	2,909,727		Turnout	92.95	–1.13
Informal votes	97,949		Informal	3.37	+0.79
Summary of votes by party
Party	Primary votes	%	Swing	Seats won	Seats held
Labor	1,187,484	42.23	▲+1.74	8	14
Liberal	1,116,347	39.70	▼–4.17	11	24
National	204,587	7.28	▲+0.65	3	6
Democrats	190,940	6.79	▲+1.06	0	0
Greens	62,796	2.23	New	0	0
Reform	6,617	0.24	New	0	0
Christian Democrats	6,608	0.24	▲+0.04	0	0
Independent	36,399	1.29	▲+0.35	0	0
Total	2,811,778			22	44
Two-party-preferred
Labor	1,408,843	50.12	▲+4.08		
Liberal/National	1,402,338	49.88	▼–4.08		

== Maps ==
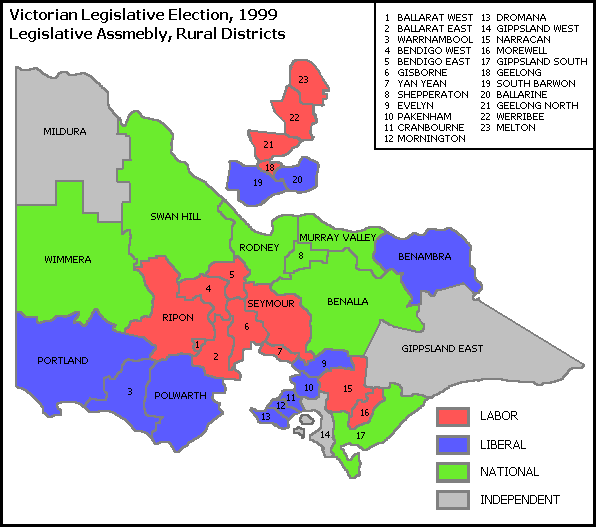

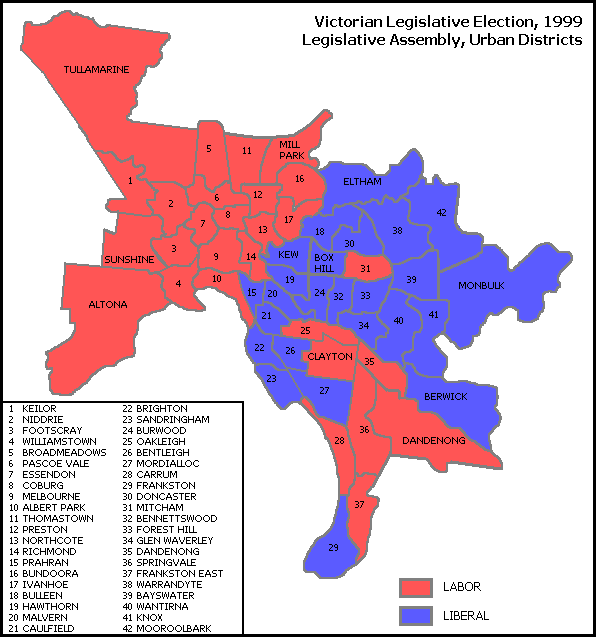

== Seats changing hands ==
Seat	Pre-1999			Swing	Post-1999		
Seat	Party	Member	Margin	Swing	Margin	Member	Party
Ballarat East	Liberal	Barry Traynor	0.1	-3.7	3.7	Geoff Howard	Labor
Ballarat West	Liberal	Paul Jenkins	1.4	-2.4	1.0	Karen Overington	Labor
Bendigo East	Liberal	Michael John	5.0	-8.1	3.1	Jacinta Allan	Labor
Carrum	Liberal	David Lean	0.8	-1.0	0.2	Jenny Lindell	Labor
Frankston East	Independent	Peter McLellan*	3.1	-7.7	4.6	Matt Viney	Labor
Geelong	Liberal	Ann Henderson	3.5	-3.5	0.03	Ian Trezise	Labor
Gippsland East	National	David Treasure	15.2	-22.9	7.7	Craig Ingram	Independent
Gisborne	Liberal	Tom Reynolds	7.8	-9.4	1.6	Jo Duncan	Labor
Narracan	Liberal	Florian Andrighetto	1.6	-4.1	2.5	Ian Maxfield	Labor
Oakleigh	Liberal	Denise McGill	0.8	-4.1	3.3	Ann Barker	Labor
Ripon	Liberal	Steve Elder	4.6	-7.2	2.6	Joe Helper	Labor
Seymour	Liberal	Marie Tehan	4.2	-4.9	0.7	Ben Hardman	Labor
Tullamarine	Liberal	Bernie Finn	3.0	-6.8	3.8	Liz Beattie	Labor
Warrnambool	National	John McGrath	13.8	-22.7	8.9	John Vogels	Liberal

- Members listed in italics did not recontest their seats.
- The Liberal-turned-Independent member for Frankston East, Peter McLellan died on election day. A supplementary election was held in which Labor won.
- In addition, Labor won Mitcham in a by-election and retained it in this election.
- In addition, Independent Susan Davies won Gippsland West in a by-election and retained it in this election.

== Campaign ==
The Kennett government entered the campaign with a substantial lead in the polls and was widely expected to win, some commentators even tipped the government to increase their already large majority.

The Liberals ran a campaign centred on Jeff Kennett and the unusual jeff.com.au website. The presidential nature of the campaign was emphasised when the Herald Sun ran a damaging front-page story revealing that most Liberal candidates were gagged from speaking to the media. The Coalition stuck to a message of focusing on its economic record, and promising modest increases in spending in schools, hospitals and police.

In contrast Labor sought to tap into perceptions in rural Victoria that the Kennett government had neglected them. Both John Brumby who led Labor until early 1999 and Steve Bracks campaigned extensively in rural and regional Victoria, attacking Coalition policies of privatisation highlighting poor service delivery. Labor also took the unusual step of launching their campaign in the regional centre of Ballarat where it announced it would spend $170 million to improve rural infrastructure. In addition Labor campaigned on issues of government transparency and service administration. By election day few people believed that there would be a change of government. When The Australian published a poll which suggested the result would be a cliffhanger, Steve Bracks is said to have stated 'I hope it's right, but I think The Australian is on drugs.' Kennett during the campaign was at the centre of controversy over a heated interview with ABC Radio presenter Jon Faine.

== Election day ==
On the afternoon of the election, while polling was being conducted, it was learned that Liberal-turned-Independent member for the marginal seat of Frankston East, Peter McLellan, had died of a heart attack. Polling was therefore aborted, with a supplementary election to be scheduled.

When the results started to come through, it appeared that there was only a modest swing to Labor in metropolitan Melbourne, even in the politically volatile eastern suburbs. However, there was a substantial swing to Labor in provincial and rural Victoria, traditionally a Liberal stronghold. Political analyst and ABC commentator Antony Green later wrote that "in the more than 35 elections I've been involved in, the 1999 Victorian election was the only one where I thought there was something wrong with the computer."

When the Victorian Electoral Commission finished counting for the night, the result was still too close to call: Labor had made huge gains in the rural hinterland, but had failed to make much headway in the eastern suburbs of Melbourne where elections had historically been won or lost.

== Frankston East and rural independents ==
Initial counting had the Coalition on 43 seats in the 88-seat chamber, Labor on 41 (including winning the seat of Geelong by just 16 votes), and the independents on three. Frankston East remained vacant pending the results of the 16 October supplementary election. As McLellan died on the day of the general election, voters in Frankston East had already cast votes before learning of McLellan's death. As McLellan died while the campaign was underway, the Victorian constitution required a supplementary election in the seat.

Regardless of who won in Frankston East, neither the Coalition nor Labor could form a government without the support of the independents, leaving them in a position to effectively choose the next premier.

On 16 October, the supplementary election resulted in a 7.71% swing to Labor, with its candidate Matt Viney winning 54.60% of the two-party preferred vote, putting Labor on 42 seats. The votes that were cast in Frankston East on the day of the election and McLellan's death had been destroyed without being counted. It is therefore unknown whether Frankston East voters had voted differently in the supplementary election than the way they voted at the general election.

The next morning, Labor and the Independents signed an agreement which became public the following day. Although this allowed Labor to form government by one seat, Kennett's supporters urged the Coalition to force a last-ditch confidence vote on the floor of the Assembly. They believed that Savage, Davies and Ingram would be forced to publicly support Kennett. In truth, Savage and Davies felt that Kennett had been dismissive during the previous term, and would not have even considered supporting any government led by Kennett. However, with the Liberals divided on Kennett's future role, Kennett resigned as premier and retired from politics.

== Aftermath ==
Kennett's resignation became official on 20 October. Soon afterward, Bracks advised the Governor, Sir James Gobbo, that he could form a government, which was duly sworn in later that day. With Kennett retiring from politics, Dr Denis Napthine, a rural MP who was believed to bring a more consensus-style approach to leadership, succeeded him as Liberal leader. Nationals leader Pat McNamara retired from politics as well. His successor, Peter Ryan, tore up the Coalition agreement; the Liberals and Nationals would not resume their Coalition until 2008.

Labor won Kennett's old seat of Burwood in a by-election that December after he decided to retire from parliament. The following year they also won McNamara's hitherto safe seat of Benalla in another by-election, which brought them to 44 of the Assembly's 88 seats.

== See also ==
- Members of the Victorian Legislative Assembly, 1999–2002
- Members of the Victorian Legislative Council, 1999–2002
- Candidates of the 1999 Victorian state election
- 1999 AFL first preliminary final
