= Electoral district of Dandenong North =

Coordinates: 37°58′S 145°13′E

Dandenong North Victoria—Legislative Assembly
- State: Victoria
- Created: 1985
- Abolished: 2002
- Demographic: Outer metropolitan

Electoral district of Dandenong North was an electoral district of the Legislative Assembly in the Australian state of Victoria.

== Members for Dandenong North ==
Member	Party	Term
Jan Wilson	Labor	1985–1999
John Lenders	Labor	1999–2002
