= Steve Bracks =

44th Premier of Victoria, Australia

The Honourable Steve Bracks AC
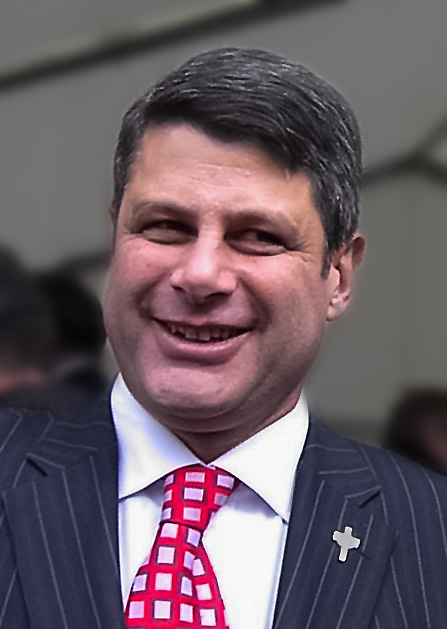
- Bracks in 2006

44th Premier of Victoria
- In office 20 October 1999 – 30 July 2007
- Monarch: Elizabeth II
- Governor: James Gobbo; John Landy; David de Kretser
- Deputy: John Thwaites
- Preceded by: Jeff Kennett
- Succeeded by: John Brumby

Leader of the Labor Party in Victoria
- In office 22 March 1999 – 30 July 2007
- Deputy: John Thwaites
- Preceded by: John Brumby
- Succeeded by: John Brumby

Leader of the Opposition in Victoria
- In office 22 March 1999 – 20 October 1999
- Premier: Jeff Kennett
- Deputy: John Thwaites
- Preceded by: John Brumby
- Succeeded by: Jeff Kennett

Minister for Multicultural Affairs
- In office 20 October 1999 – 30 July 2007
- Premier: Himself
- Preceded by: Jeff Kennett
- Succeeded by: John Brumby

Minister for Veterans' Affairs
- In office 5 December 2002 – 30 July 2007
- Premier: Himself
- Preceded by: New position
- Succeeded by: John Brumby

Treasurer of Victoria
- In office 20 October 1999 – 22 May 2000
- Premier: Himself
- Preceded by: Denis Napthine
- Succeeded by: John Brumby

Member of the Victorian Legislative Assembly for Williamstown
- In office 13 August 1994 – 6 August 2007
- Preceded by: Joan Kirner
- Succeeded by: Wade Noonan

Personal details
- Born: Stephen Phillip Bracks; 15 October 1954 (age 72) Ballarat, Victoria, Australia
- Party: Labor
- Spouse: Terry Horsfall
- Children: 3
- Education: University of Ballarat
- Profession: Teacher
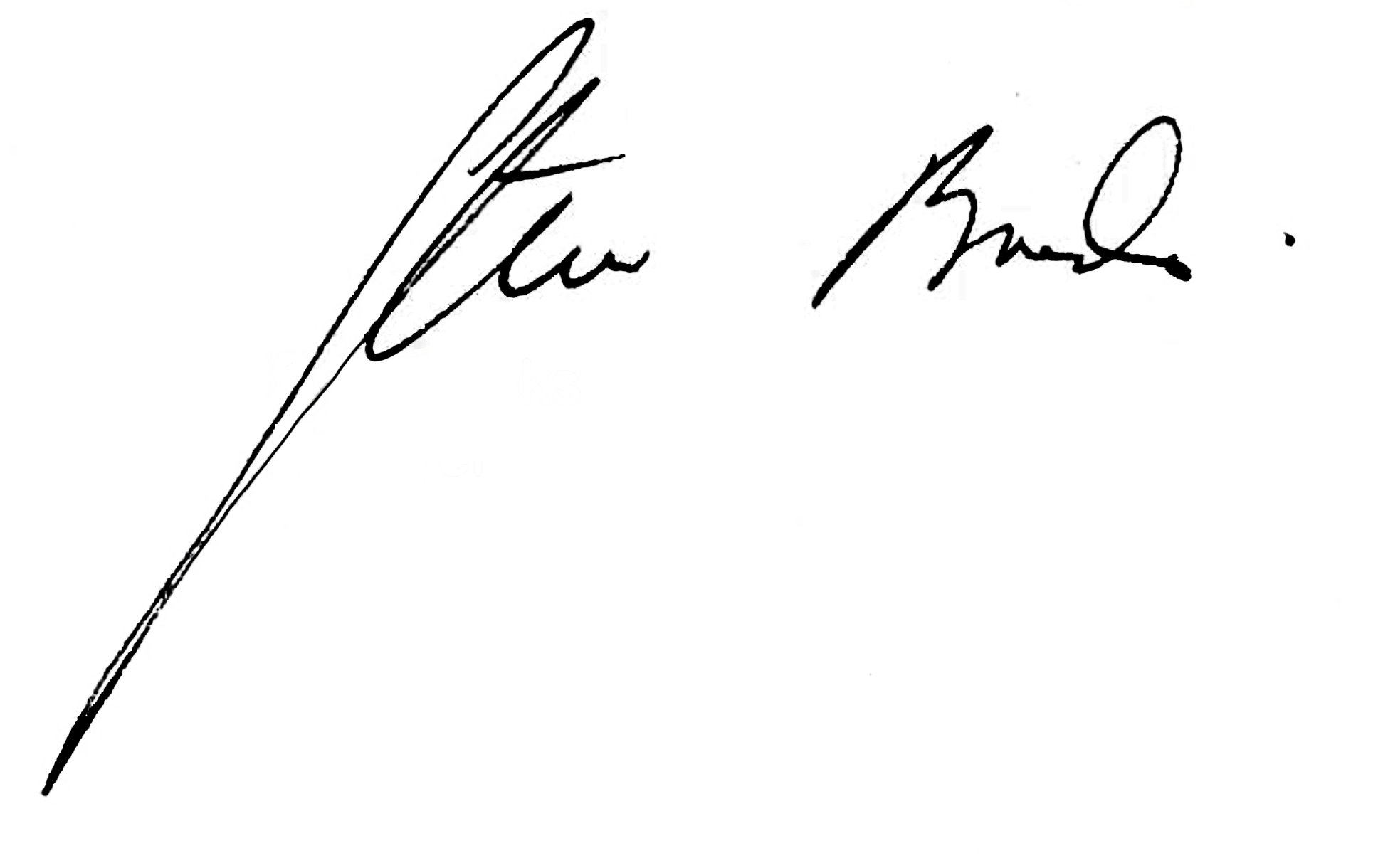
- Signature
- Website: stevebracks.com.au

Stephen Phillip Bracks (born 15 October 1954) is an Australian former politician and teacher who served as the 44th premier of Victoria and leader of the Victorian Labor Party from 1999 to 2007. He was the member of the Legislative Assembly (MP) for the district of Williamstown from 1994 to 2007, and has served as the sixth chancellor of Victoria University since his appointment in 2021.

Bracks led Labor in Victoria to minority government at the 1999 election, defeating the incumbent Jeff Kennett Liberal and National coalition government. Labor was returned with a majority government after a landslide win at the 2002 election. Labor was elected for a third term at the 2006 election with a substantial but reduced majority. The treasurer, John Brumby, became Labor leader and premier in 2007 when Bracks retired from politics. Bracks is the third-longest-serving Labor premier in Victorian history, surpassed only by John Cain Jr. and Daniel Andrews.

== Early life ==
Steve Bracks was born in Ballarat, where his family owns a fashion business. He is a Lebanese Australian; his paternal grandfather came to Australia as a child from Zahlé in the Beqaa Valley of Lebanon in the 1890s. His family were Melkite Catholic before migrating and became Latin Catholic.

Bracks was educated in Ballarat at St Patrick's College and the Ballarat College of Advanced Education (now Federation University), where he graduated in business studies and education. He became a keen follower of Australian rules football, supporting the Geelong Football Club.

== Before politics ==
From 1976 to 1981, Bracks was a school commerce teacher at Sacred Heart College, Ballarat. During the 1980s he worked in local government in Ballarat and then as executive director of the Ballarat Education Centre. While in these positions he twice (1985 and 1988) contested the seat of Ballarat North in the Victorian Legislative Assembly for the Labor Party.

In 1989 Bracks was appointed statewide manager of Victorian state government employment programs, under the Labor government of John Cain Jr. He then became an adviser to both Cain and Cain's successor as Premier, Joan Kirner. Here he witnessed from the inside the collapse of the Labor government following the economic and budgetary crisis which began in 1988. This experience gave Bracks a conservative and cautious view of economic management in government.

Following the defeat of the Kirner government by the Liberal leader Jeff Kennett in late 1992, Bracks became executive director of the Victorian Printing Industry Training Board. Kirner resigned from parliament in 1994, and Bracks was elected to Kirner's seat of Williamstown in the western suburbs of Melbourne. Bracks and his wife Terry lived in Williamstown. They have three children, one of whom is model Nick Bracks.

== State politics ==
=== Early days ===
Bracks was immediately elected to Labor's front bench, as Shadow Minister for Employment, Industrial Relations and Tourism. In 1996, after Labor under John Brumby was again defeated, he became Shadow Treasurer. In March 1999, when it became apparent that Labor was headed for another defeat under Brumby's leadership, Brumby resigned and Bracks was elected Opposition Leader.

=== First term as Premier ===
Political observers were almost unanimous that Bracks had no chance of defeating Liberal premier Jeff Kennett at the September 1999 election: polls gave Kennett a 60% popularity rating. Bracks and his senior colleagues (particularly Brumby, who comes from Bendigo) campaigned heavily in regional areas, accusing Kennett of ignoring regional communities. In response, voters in regional areas deserted the Kennett government. On election night, much to its own surprise, Labor increased its seat count from 29 to 41, with the Liberals and their National Party allies retaining 43, and three falling to rural independents. With the Coalition one seat short of government, the election was to be decided in Frankston East, when the death of incumbent Peter McLellan forced a supplementary election. That supplementary election was won by Labor on a large swing, resulting in a hung parliament. The independents then threw their support to Labor, allowing Bracks to form government by one seat.

The Coalition briefly considered forcing Bracks to demonstrate that he had support on the floor of the Assembly. However, two of the independents, Russell Savage and Susan Davies, felt Kennett had given them short shrift in the previous legislature, and would not have even considered supporting him. In any event, this gambit was brought undone when Kennett announced his retirement from politics on 20 October. Bracks then advised the Governor, Sir James Gobbo, that he could form a government, which was duly sworn in later that day. Bracks became the first Catholic Labor Premier of Victoria since 1932.

Former leader Brumby, appointed Treasurer, was regarded as a major part of the government's success. He and the Deputy Premier and Minister for Health, John Thwaites, and the Attorney-General, Rob Hulls, were regarded as the key ministers in the Bracks government.

Following a pre-1999 election commitment to consider the feasibility of introducing fast rail services to regional centres, in 2000 the government approved funding for the Regional Fast Rail project, upgrading rail lines between Melbourne and Ballarat, Bendigo, Geelong and Traralgon. However, in 2006 the Victorian Auditor General noted that in spite of $750 million spent, "We found that the delivery of more frequent fast rail services in the Geelong, Ballarat, and Bendigo corridors by the agreed dates was not achieved. In total, the journey time outcomes will be more modest than we would have expected with only a minority of travellers likely to benefit from significant journey time improvements. These outcomes occur because giving some passengers full express services means bypassing often large numbers of passengers at intermediate stations along the corridors."

On 14 December 2000, Steve Bracks released a document outlining his government's intent to introduce the Racial and Religious Tolerance Act 2001.

The major criticism of Bracks's first government was that their insistence on consultation stood in the way of effective, proactive government. Bracks, according to critics, achieved little, and lost the excitement of constant change that was characteristic of the Kennett years. The talents of some of the more junior ministers in the government were also questioned. Nevertheless, Bracks got through his first term without major mishaps, and his popularity undiminished.

=== Second term as Premier ===
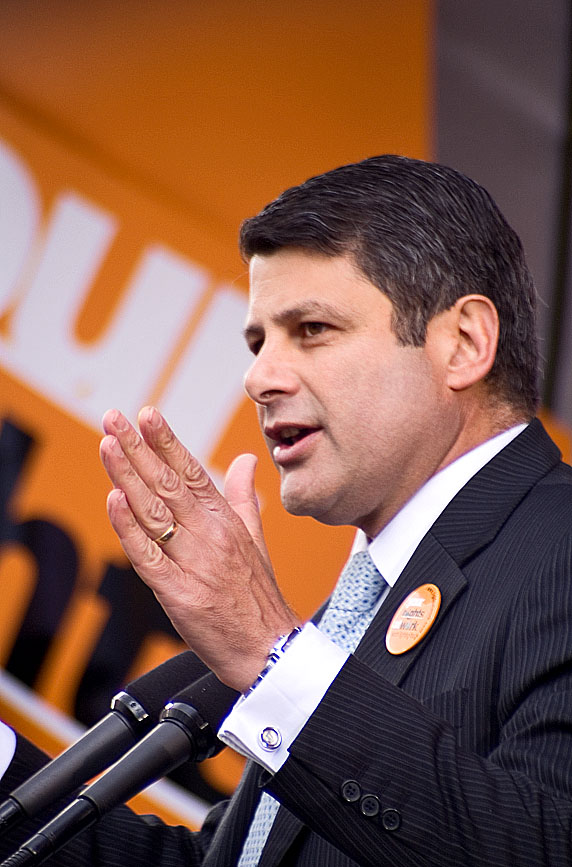
Bracks in 2005

Labor won the 2002 election in a landslide, taking 62 seats out of 88 in the Legislative Assembly—only the third time in Victoria's history that a Labor government had been reelected. In another first, Labor won a slim but clear majority in the Legislative Council as well. While this was the greatest victory Labor had ever had in a Victorian state election, it brought with it considerable risks. With majorities in both houses Bracks could no longer cite his weak parliamentary position as an excuse for inaction.

On 28 August 2002, Bracks, in conjunction with his then New South Wales counterpart, Bob Carr, opened the Mowamba aqueduct between Jindabyne and Dalgety, to divert 38 gigalitres of water a year from Lake Eucumbene to the Snowy and Murray rivers. The ten-year plan cost A$300 million with Victoria and NSW splitting the costs. Melbourne Water has stated that within 50 years there will be 20 per cent less water going into Victorian reservoirs.

In May 2003 Bracks broke an election promise and announced that the proposed Scoresby Freeway in Melbourne's eastern suburbs would be a tollway rather than a freeway, as promised at the 2002 elections. As well as risking a loss of support in marginal seats in eastern Melbourne, this decision brought about a strong response from the Howard Federal government, which cut off federal funding for the project on the grounds that the Bracks government had reneged on the terms of the federal-state funding agreement. The decision seems to have been on the recommendation of Brumby, who was concerned with the state's budgetary position. Also opposing the decision was the Federal Labor Opposition, which feared anti-Labor reaction at the 2004 federal election. The then Opposition Leader Mark Latham described a meeting with Bracks and federal shadow ministers, writing:

Bracks has broken his promise, hoping the odium will wear off before the next State election. But we're copping the fall-out electorally... Bracks, however, was unmoved, even when Faulkner put it right on him... Sat there like a statue, that silly grin on his face.

— The Latham Diaries, page 283.

This backflip, while seen by some as an opportunity for the Liberals to make ground, saw the then leader of the Liberals, Robert Doyle, adopt a much-criticised policy of half tolls, which was later overturned by his successor, Ted Baillieu.

In 2005, following extensive independent studies it was found that cattle had created extensive damage to the high country National Park and their continued presence in the Park was incompatible with the values of National Parks. Bracks backed the environment and his environment minister, John Thwaites and announced that Victoria would follow the NSW example and cattlemen would be banned from using the "High Plains" in Victoria's National Parks to graze cattle. Stockmen had been fearing this decision since 1984, when a Labor government excised land to create the Alpine National Park. Some estimated three hundred cattlemen rode horses down Bourke street in protest while police said it was closer to 100. Colourful Victorian National Party leader Peter Ryan was quoted as saying that Bracks had killed "The Man from Snowy River" (although the poem was about mustering horses, not cattle – a practice which was stopped in the high country just after World War 2.)

Bracks' second government achieved one of Victorian Labor's longest-held goals with a complete reform of the state's system for electing its upper house. It saw the introduction of proportional representation, with eight five-member regions replacing the current single-member constituencies. This system increases the opportunity for minor parties such as the Greens and DLP to win seats in the Legislative Council, giving them a greater chance of holding the balance of power. Illustrating the historic importance Labor assigns to the changes, in a speech to a conference celebrating the 150th anniversary of the Eureka Stockade, Bracks said it was "another victory for the aspirations of Eureka", and has described the changes as "his proudest achievement".

The staging of the 2006 Commonwealth Games, generally viewed as a success (albeit an expensive one), was viewed as a plus for Bracks and the government. With times reasonably good, a perception arguably reinforced by an extensive government advertising campaign selling the virtues of Victoria to Victorians, polls indicated little interest in change, although towards the end of the election campaign polling indicated that the Liberals under Baillieu were closing the gap.

=== Third term as Premier ===
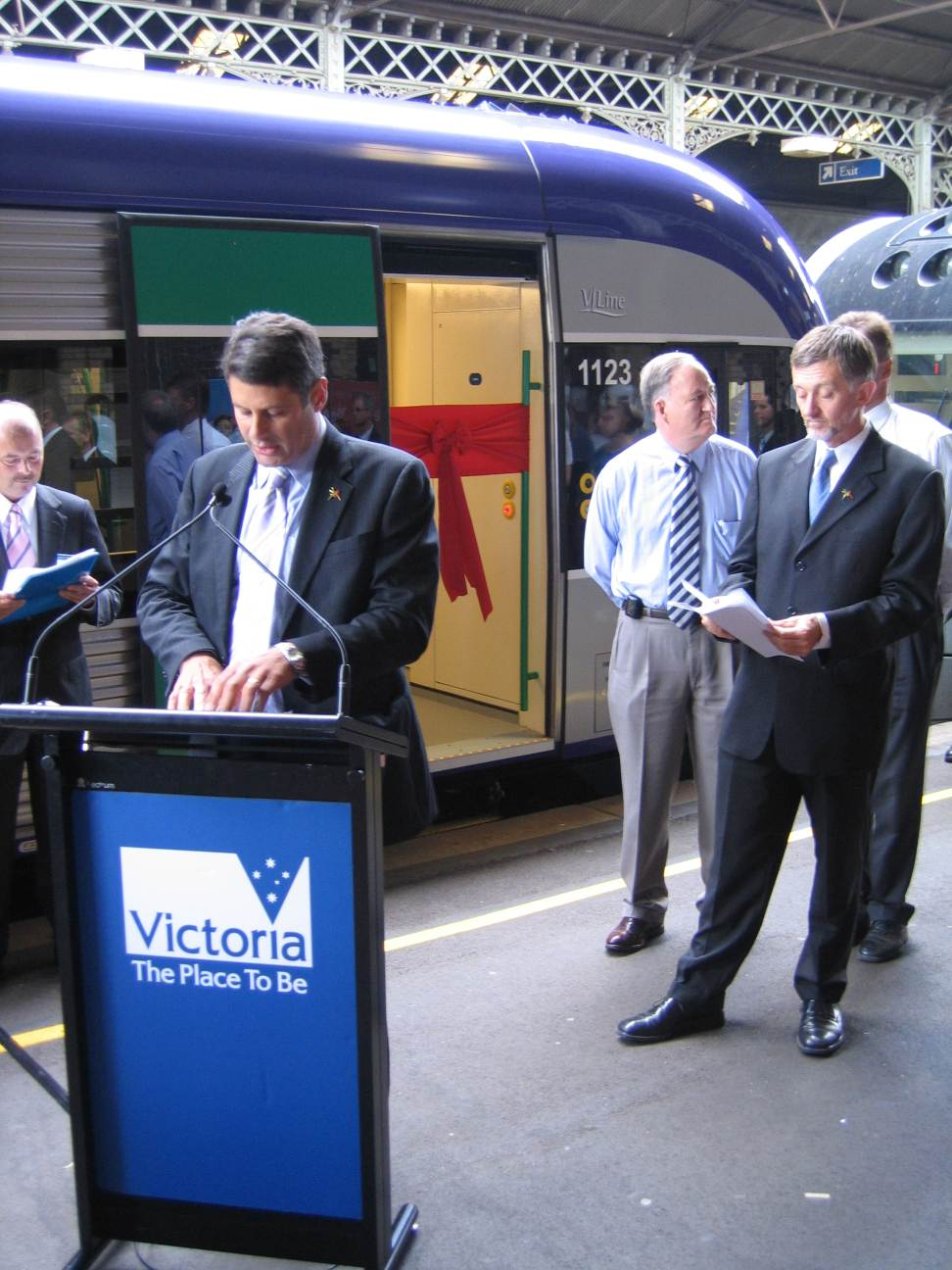
Steve Bracks and Transport minister Peter Batchelor at the launch of the Regional Fast Rail project Geelong line upgrades in February 2006

The election campaign was a relatively low-key affair, with the Government and Bracks largely running on their record, as well as their plans to tackle infrastructure issues in their third term. Bracks' image loomed large in Labor's election advertising. Liberal attacks concentrated on the slow process of infrastructure development under Bracks (notably on water supply issues relating to the severe drought affecting Victoria in the election leadup), and new Liberal leader Ted Baillieu promised to start construction on a range of new infrastructure initiatives, including a new dam on the Maribyrnong River and a desalination plant. Labor's broken election promise on Eastlink was also expected to be a factor in some seats in the eastern suburbs of Melbourne.

On 25 November 2006, Steve Bracks won his third election, comfortably defeating Baillieu to secure a third term, with a slightly reduced majority in the Lower House. This marked only the second time that the Victorian Labor Party had won a third term in office. His third term Cabinet was sworn in on 1 December 2006 with Bracks also holding the portfolio of Minister for Veterans' Affairs and Multicultural Affairs.

=== Resignation ===
Bracks announced his resignation as Premier on 27 July 2007, saying this was to spend more time with his family. He stepped down on 30 July 2007. According to the ABC, Bracks had been under political and personal pressure in the weeks before his resignation. Alone among State Premiers, he had refused to agree to the Federal Government's $10 billion Murray–Darling basin water conservation plan, and his son had been involved in an accident involving a charge of drink driving. Bracks told a media conference he could no longer give a 100 per cent commitment to politics:

Once you reach a point where you can no longer make that commitment, the choice is clear – I have made that choice.

— Steve Bracks, announcing his retirement

Bracks' deputy John Thwaites announced his resignation on the same day. News of the resignations caused surprise to the general community as well as to politicians. It was revealed that then Federal Labor Leader Kevin Rudd was informed only minutes before the announcement, and tried to talk Bracks out of his decision. Bracks' Treasurer John Brumby was elected unopposed by the Victorian Labor Caucus as Premier, while Attorney-General Rob Hulls was elected Deputy Premier.

One consequence of Bracks leaving politics may have been the introduction of abortion law reform in Victoria. It has been suggested that the resignation of Premier Bracks sowed the seeds for abortion law reform by legislation that parliamentarians previously had refused to support, fearing a backlash from anti-abortion groups led by veteran campaigner Margaret Tighe. Bracks, as a Catholic of Lebanese descent, almost certainly would not have allowed abortion legislation into the parliament, but his successor John Brumby did not share this view, and the Abortion Law Reform Bill introduced by upper house member Candy Broad was passed by the Parliament in 2008.

== After politics ==
In August 2007, following his resignation as Premier, Bracks announced he would provide a short-term pro bono advising role in East Timor working alongside the newly elected Prime Minister Xanana Gusmão. Bracks was to spend a year travelling between Melbourne and Dili helping with the establishment of Gusmão's administration, the key departments that would need to be involved, and advising on how they would be accountable and reportable to the legislature.

During 2008 Bracks indicated his support for Victorian abortion law reform in Victoria.

In addition to his role advising Gusmão, Bracks also joined several company advisory boards: KPMG, insurance firm Jardine Lloyd Thompson Group, the AIMS Financial Group and the NAB. The KPMG appointment was controversial, as the Victorian government had awarded the firm over 100 contracts during Bracks' time as Premier. On 14 February 2008, the Federal Labor Government appointed Bracks to head an inquiry into the ongoing viability of the Australian car industry.

In 2010, Bracks was appointed a Companion of the Order of Australia for services to the community and the Parliament of Victoria. In recognition of his distinguished services to the Victorian community, he was awarded the degree of Doctor of Laws (honoris causa) – LL.D (h.c.) by Deakin University on 27 April 2010. He was also appointed to the Honorary Chair of the Deakin University Foundation.

In February 2013 after the announcement that Nicola Roxon would retire from federal politics, Bracks was cited as a possible candidate for her safe Labor seat of Gellibrand, but he ruled out running for the seat.

Bracks was appointed to the role of Australian consul-general in New York in May 2013, by the Federal ALP Government of Julia Gillard. At the time, the shadow Foreign Minister, the Deputy Liberal leader Julie Bishop, described the appointment as "inappropriate" because of the proximity to the upcoming election and "arrogant" because of a lack of consultation with the then-opposition. Following the defeat of the ALP at the 7 September election, incoming foreign minister Julie Bishop reversed the appointment in a decision described as 'petty and vindictive' by acting ALP foreign affairs spokeswoman Tanya Plibersek.

In March 2019, it was announced that Bracks will serve as the 6th Chancellor of Victoria University from 2021.

In June 2020, Bracks and former federal Labor deputy leader Jenny Macklin were appointed as administrators of the Victorian branch of the Australian Labor Party by the party's National Executive until early 2021, after allegations of branch-stacking by Victorian minister Adem Somyurek were revealed. The pair reviewed the state party's operations and provided detailed recommendations to tackle the issue of branch-stacking within the party.

Parliament of Victoria
Preceded by Joan Kirner	Member for Williamstown; 1994–2007	Succeeded by Wade Noonan
Political offices
Preceded by Alan Stockdale	Treasurer of Victoria; 1999–2000	Succeeded by John Brumby
Preceded by Jeff Kennett	Premier of Victoria; 1999–2007	Succeeded by John Brumby
Party political offices
Preceded by John Brumby	Leader of the Labor Party in Victoria; 1999–2007	Succeeded by John Brumby
Diplomatic posts
Preceded by Phil Scanlan	Australian Consul-General in New York; 2013	Succeeded by Nick Minchin
