= Electoral district of Bulleen =

State electoral district of Victoria, Australia

Bulleen Victoria—Legislative Assembly
- Interactive map of electoral district boundaries from the 2022 state election
- State: Victoria
- Created: 1985
- MP: Matthew Guy
- Party: Liberal Party
- Namesake: Bulleen
- Electors: 44,110 (2018)
- Area: 39 km^{2} (15.1 sq mi)
- Demographic: Metropolitan

The electoral district of Bulleen is an electoral district of the Victorian Legislative Assembly. It covers an area of 39 square kilometres (15 sq mi) in eastern Melbourne, including the suburbs of Bulleen, Doncaster, Templestowe Lower, and part of Templestowe. It lies within the Eastern Metropolitan Region of the upper house, the Legislative Council.

Bulleen was created in 1985, and has been a safe seat for the Liberal Party since its inception. It was won at its first election by David Perrin, the outgoing secretary of the Victorian Dairy Industry Authority. Perrin served four terms as member for the seat, and was an outspoken conservative backbencher during the Kennett government, opposing Kennett on drug reform, euthanasia, and gay and lesbian anti-discrimination laws. In 1999, Perrin lost Liberal preselection to former Kennett adviser Nicholas Kotsiras in a bitter contest which saw numerous claims of branch stacking.

Kotsiras subsequently also served four terms as member for Bulleen. He held many shadow portfolios in opposition between 2002 and 2010, and served as a minister in both the Baillieu and Napthine governments from 2010 to 2014. He held the roles of Minister for Multicultural Affairs and Citizenship from 2010 to 2014, and Minister for Energy and Resources from 2013 to 2014. In early 2014, Kotsiras announced that he would retire at the 2014 election, and resigned from the ministry in March.

Kotsiras was succeeded as member for Bulleen by then-Legislative Council member and Minister for Planning Matthew Guy, who successfully switched to the Legislative Assembly. Guy was elected Opposition Leader in December 2014 in the aftermath of the Liberal government's election defeat.

== Members for Bulleen ==
Member	Party	Term
David Perrin	Liberal	1985–1999
Nicholas Kotsiras	Liberal	1999–2014
Matthew Guy	Liberal	2014–present

== Election results ==
2022 Victorian state election: Bulleen
Party	Candidate	Votes	%	±%
Liberal	Matthew Guy	20,645	48.1	−3.6
Labor	Ian Rogers	14,052	32.7	−4.1
Greens	Kellie Stafford	4,576	10.7	−0.3
Freedom	Voula Patrikios	1,172	2.7	+2.7
Family First	Jason Stokes	1,014	2.4	+2.4
Animal Justice	Elnaz Jafari	867	2.0	+1.6
Independent	Sanjeev Sabhlok	419	1.0	+1.0
Independent	David Vincent	214	0.5	+0.5
Total formal votes		42,959	94.9	+1.4
Informal votes		2,326	5.1	−1.4
Turnout		45,285	89.7	+0.6
Two-party-preferred result
Liberal	Matthew Guy	24,030	55.9	+0.4
Labor	Ian Rogers	18,929	44.1	−0.4
Liberal hold		Swing	+0.4	

Two-party-preferred vote results in Bulleen View source data.
