= Peter McLellan =

Australian politician

Frederick Peter McLellan (20 October 1942 – 18 September 1999) was an Australian politician.

== Early life ==
McLellan was born in Melbourne in 1942, attending Holy Name Primary School in East Preston and Taylor's College.

== Career and death ==
From 1956, he worked for Rhodes Motor Company before joining the Army in 1961; he served in the Vietnam War from 1966 to 1967.

From 1969 he was a road service patrolman with the Royal Automobile Club of Victoria until he became a self-employed motor mechanic in 1976.

A member of the Liberal Party, McLellan was elected to the Victorian Legislative Assembly in 1992 as the member for Frankston East. He served on the Road Safety Committee, but on 24 July 1998 resigned from the Liberal Party to sit as an independent. He recontested his seat at the 1999 state election, but died on election day in Frankston; the election for his seat was postponed, which delayed a clear result since the election had resulted in a hung parliament.

Victorian Legislative Assembly
New seat	Member for Frankston East; 1992–1999	Succeeded by Matt Viney
