= Electoral district of Frankston East =

Frankston East Victoria—Legislative Assembly
- State: Victoria
- Created: 1992
- Abolished: 2002
- Demographic: Outer metropolitan
- Coordinates: 38°09′S 145°09′E

Electoral district of Frankston East was an electoral district of the Legislative Assembly in the Australian state of Victoria. It was created in 1992, mostly out of the old Frankston North.

The seat is notable for having decided the 1999 state election, which proved to be the last election in which it was contested. The incumbent, Liberal-turned-independent Peter McLellan, died on election day, forcing a supplementary election a month later. Neither the Coalition nor Labor had won a majority, placing the balance of power in the hands of three independents. They deferred their decision until the supplementary election. In the 16 October supplementary election, Labor candidate Matt Viney won on a swing of 7.7 percent, resulting in a hung parliament. The independents then announced their support for Labor, making Labor leader Steve Bracks premier.

== Members for Frankston East ==
Member	Party	Term
Peter McLellan	Liberal	1992–1998
Peter McLellan	Independent	1998–1999
Matt Viney	Labor	1999–2002
