= Electoral results for the district of Monbulk =

Victoria, Australia, district election results

This is a list of electoral results for the Electoral district of Monbulk in Victorian state elections.

== Members for Monbulk ==
Member	Party	Term
Bill Borthwick	Liberal	1967–1982
Neil Pope	Labor	1982–1992
Steve McArthur	Liberal	1992–2002
James Merlino	Labor	2002–2022
Daniela De Martino	Labor	2022–present

== Election results ==
=== Elections in the 2020s ===
2022 Victorian state election: Monbulk
Party	Candidate	Votes	%	±%
Labor	Daniela De Martino	15,071	36.1	−6.0
Liberal	Gareth Ward	12,327	29.5	−8.1
Greens	Michael Ormsby	6,255	15.0	−1.2
Independent	Johanna Skelton	2,229	5.3	+5.3
Independent	Craig Cole	2,069	5.0	+5.0
Animal Justice	Leah Folloni	1,739	4.2	+4.0
Family First	David Higgins	1,197	2.9	+2.9
Freedom	Veronica Barnes	910	2.2	+2.2
Total formal votes		41,797	95.3	+0.4
Informal votes		2,063	4.7	−0.4
Turnout		43,860	90.4	
Two-party-preferred result
Labor	Daniela De Martino	24,056	57.6	+0.5
Liberal	Gareth Ward	17,741	42.4	–0.5
Labor hold		Swing	–0.5	

=== Elections in the 2010s ===
2018 Victorian state election: Monbulk
Party	Candidate	Votes	%	±%
Labor	James Merlino	15,912	41.89	+4.35
Liberal	John Schurink	13,823	36.39	−3.73
Greens	Liz Hicks	5,826	15.34	+1.94
Democratic Labour	Joshua Norman	1,251	3.29	+2.14
Independent	Jordan Crook	1,176	3.10	+2.18
Total formal votes		37,988	95.15	+0.31
Informal votes		1,938	4.85	−0.31
Turnout		39,926	92.16	−2.32
Two-party-preferred result
Labor	James Merlino	22,266	58.61	+3.65
Liberal	John Schurink	15,722	41.39	−3.65
Labor hold		Swing	+3.65	

2014 Victorian state election: Monbulk
Party	Candidate	Votes	%	±%
Liberal	Mark Verschuur	15,063	40.1	−4.6
Labor	James Merlino	14,096	37.5	+3.4
Greens	Michael Clarke	5,029	13.4	−1.6
Animal Justice	Jennifer McAdam	1,079	2.9	+2.9
Family First	Amelia Mason	786	2.1	−0.0
Democratic Labour	Ron Prendergast	433	1.2	−0.4
Rise Up Australia	Ana Rojas	427	1.1	+1.1
Independent	Jordan Crook	342	0.9	+0.9
Country Alliance	Craig Jenkin	293	0.8	−0.2
Total formal votes		37,548	94.8	−0.7
Informal votes		2,044	5.2	+0.7
Turnout		39,592	94.5	−1.6
Two-party-preferred result
Labor	James Merlino	20,643	55.0	+6.1
Liberal	Mark Verschuur	16,905	45.0	−6.1
Labor notional gain from Liberal		Swing	+6.1	

2010 Victorian state election: Monbulk
Party	Candidate	Votes	%	±%
Liberal	Matt Mills	14,506	42.55	+5.16
Labor	James Merlino	12,318	36.14	−4.47
Greens	Jo Tenner	5,244	15.38	−0.78
Democratic Labor	Elizabeth Coyne	618	1.81	+1.81
Family First	Rajeeva Gunasekera	610	1.79	−2.37
Country Alliance	Simon Picknell	528	1.55	+1.55
Independent	Lawrence Mobsby	264	0.77	+0.77
Total formal votes		34,088	95.56	−0.29
Informal votes		1,582	4.44	+0.29
Turnout		35,670	94.15	+0.18
Two-party-preferred result
Labor	James Merlino	17,762	52.08	−4.45
Liberal	Matt Mills	16,345	47.92	+4.45
Labor hold		Swing	−4.45	

=== Elections in the 2000s ===
2006 Victorian state election: Monbulk
Party	Candidate	Votes	%	±%
Labor	James Merlino	13,263	40.6	−3.0
Liberal	Clive Larkman	12,212	37.4	-0.0
Greens	Robert Stephen	5,278	16.2	+0.4
Family First	Carl Huybers	1,359	4.2	+4.2
People Power	Joanne Stride	547	1.7	+1.7
Total formal votes		32,659	95.8	−1.3
Informal votes		1,415	4.2	+1.3
Turnout		34,074	94.0	
Two-party-preferred result
Labor	James Merlino	18,511	56.7	−1.6
Liberal	Clive Larkman	14,148	43.3	+1.6
Labor hold		Swing	−1.6	

2002 Victorian state election: Monbulk
Party	Candidate	Votes	%	±%
Labor	James Merlino	14,303	43.6	+3.0
Liberal	Steve McArthur	12,285	37.4	−11.6
Greens	Craig Smith	5,182	15.8	+8.8
Democrats	Tony Holland	537	1.6	+1.6
Christian Democrats	Wolf Voigt	532	1.6	+0.4
Total formal votes		32,839	97.1	−0.2
Informal votes		974	2.9	+0.2
Turnout		33,813	93.6	
Two-party-preferred result
Labor	James Merlino	19,132	58.3	+10.7
Liberal	Steve McArthur	13,707	41.7	−10.7
Labor gain from Liberal		Swing	+10.7	

=== Elections in the 1990s ===
1999 Victorian state election: Monbulk
Party	Candidate	Votes	%	±%
Liberal	Steve McArthur	15,206	49.8	−2.7
Labor	Leslie Wood	12,266	40.2	+2.0
Greens	Robyn Holtham	1,928	6.3	+6.3
Democratic Labor	Frank Feltham	443	1.5	+1.5
Christian Democrats	Wolf Voigt	414	1.4	+1.4
Natural Law	Lorna Scurfield	258	0.8	−0.5
Total formal votes		30,515	97.2	−0.8
Informal votes		870	2.8	+0.8
Turnout		31,385	93.3	
Two-party-preferred result
Liberal	Steve McArthur	16,241	53.2	−2.0
Labor	Leslie Wood	14,306	46.8	+2.0
Liberal hold		Swing	−2.0	

1996 Victorian state election: Monbulk
Party	Candidate	Votes	%	±%
Liberal	Steve McArthur	15,684	52.5	+1.7
Labor	Philip Staindl	11,390	38.2	+2.0
Independent	Louis Delacretaz	2,024	6.8	+6.8
Natural Law	Jennifer Brain	390	1.3	−0.6
Independent	Terry Lonergan	358	1.2	+1.2
Total formal votes		29,846	98.1	+1.1
Informal votes		586	1.9	−1.1
Turnout		30,432	94.5	
Two-party-preferred result
Liberal	Steve McArthur	16,442	55.2	−0.1
Labor	Philip Staindl	13,325	44.8	+0.1
Liberal hold		Swing	−0.1	

1992 Victorian state election: Monbulk
Party	Candidate	Votes	%	±%
Liberal	Steve McArthur	14,584	50.8	+8.4
Labor	Neil Pope	10,368	36.1	−16.0
Independent	Jenny Saulwick	1,646	5.7	+5.7
Democrats	John McLaren	1,568	5.5	+5.2
Natural Law	Bill Watson	542	1.9	+1.9
Total formal votes		28,708	96.9	−0.3
Informal votes		907	3.1	+0.3
Turnout		29,615	95.6	
Two-party-preferred result
Liberal	Steve McArthur	15,814	55.3	+9.6
Labor	Neil Pope	12,771	44.7	−9.6
Liberal gain from Labor		Swing	+9.6	

=== Elections in the 1980s ===
1988 Victorian state election: Monbulk
Party	Candidate	Votes	%	±%
Labor	Neil Pope	14,384	51.89	−1.82
Liberal	Nola Vulling	12,167	43.89	−2.40
Call to Australia	Christopher Shirreff	1,168	4.21	+4.21
Total formal votes		27,719	97.26	−0.50
Informal votes		781	2.74	+0.50
Turnout		28,500	92.77	+0.14
Two-party-preferred result
Labor	Neil Pope	14,840	53.54	−0.17
Liberal	Nola Vulling	12,879	46.46	+0.17
Labor hold		Swing	−0.17	

1985 Victorian state election: Monbulk
Party	Candidate	Votes	%	±%
Labor	Neil Pope	14,239	53.7	+12.3
Liberal	Raymond Yates	12,270	46.3	+7.1
Total formal votes		26,509	97.8	
Informal votes		608	2.2	
Turnout		27,117	92.6	
Labor hold		Swing	+0.9	

1982 Victorian state election: Monbulk
Party	Candidate	Votes	%	±%
Labor	Neil Pope	12,477	41.8	0.0
Liberal	Bill Borthwick	11,727	39.3	−7.0
Independent	Bert Wainer	2,892	9.7	+9.7
Democrats	Milton Blake	2,001	6.7	−4.1
Independent	Jean Langworthy	737	2.5	+2.5
Total formal votes		29,834	97.5	0.0
Informal votes		748	2.5	0.0
Turnout		30,582	93.4	+1.0
Two-party-preferred result
Labor	Neil Pope	15,809	53.0	+5.2
Liberal	Bill Borthwick	14,025	47.0	−5.2
Labor gain from Liberal		Swing	+5.2	

=== Elections in the 1970s ===
1979 Victorian state election: Monbulk
Party	Candidate	Votes	%	±%
Liberal	Bill Borthwick	12,619	46.3	−10.3
Labor	Francesco Cafarella	11,400	41.8	−1.6
Democrats	Malcolm Matheson	2,938	10.8	+10.8
Australia	Ian Wood	301	1.1	+1.1
Total formal votes		27,258	97.5	−0.3
Informal votes		693	2.5	+0.3
Turnout		27,951	92.4	+0.9
Two-party-preferred result
Liberal	Bill Borthwick	14,224	52.2	−4.4
Labor	Francesco Cafarella	13,034	47.8	+4.4
Liberal hold		Swing	−4.4	

1976 Victorian state election: Monbulk
Party	Candidate	Votes	%	±%
Liberal	Bill Borthwick	13,978	56.6	+5.0
Labor	Stuart Morris	10,704	43.4	+2.7
Total formal votes		24,682	97.8	
Informal votes		561	2.2	
Turnout		25,243	91.5	
Liberal hold		Swing	+0.1	

1973 Victorian state election: Monbulk
Party	Candidate	Votes	%	±%
Liberal	Bill Borthwick	17,494	51.7	+4.4
Labor	Vernon Allison	13,690	40.5	−1.4
Australia	David Barford	1,431	4.2	+4.2
Democratic Labor	Franciscus Hallewas	1,215	3.6	−7.2
Total formal votes		33,830	97.7	+0.6
Informal votes		788	2.3	−0.6
Turnout		34,618	92.2	−1.9
Two-party-preferred result
Liberal	Bill Borthwick	19,099	56.5	−0.2
Labor	Vernon Allison	14,731	43.5	+0.2
Liberal hold		Swing	−0.2	

1970 Victorian state election: Monbulk
Party	Candidate	Votes	%	±%
Liberal	Bill Borthwick	12,582	47.3	−3.6
Labor	James Simmonds	11,151	41.9	+5.6
Democratic Labor	George Noone	2,865	10.8	−0.8
Total formal votes		26,598	97.1	+0.3
Informal votes		791	2.9	−0.3
Turnout		27,389	94.1	+0.4
Two-party-preferred result
Liberal	Bill Borthwick	15,079	56.7	−4.6
Labor	James Simmonds	11,519	43.3	+4.6
Liberal hold		Swing	−4.6	

=== Elections in the 1960s ===
1967 Victorian state election: Monbulk
Party	Candidate	Votes	%	±%
Liberal	Bill Borthwick	11,621	50.9	−2.6
Labor	Margaret Howells	8,290	36.3	+0.8
Democratic Labor	Noel Clarke	2,642	11.6	+0.5
Independent	Ronald Pike	290	1.3	+1.3
Total formal votes		22,843	96.8	
Informal votes		750	3.2	
Turnout		23,593	93.7	
Two-party-preferred result
Liberal	Bill Borthwick	14,012	61.3	−1.6
Labor	Margaret Howells	8,831	38.7	+1.6
Liberal hold		Swing	−1.6	
