= Electoral results for the district of Scoresby =

Victoria, Australia, district election results

This is a list of electoral results for the Electoral district of Scoresby in Victorian state elections.

== Members for Scoresby ==
First incarnation (1945–1976)
Member	Party	Term
Sir George Knox	Liberal	1945–1960
Bill Borthwick	Liberal	1960–1967
Geoff Hayes	Liberal	1967–1976
Second incarnation (2002–present)
Member	Party	Term
Kim Wells	Liberal	2002–2014

== Election results ==
=== Elections in the 2010s ===
2010 Victorian state election: Scoresby
Party	Candidate	Votes	%	±%
Liberal	Kim Wells	20,745	59.05	+5.93
Labor	Garry Nightingale	10,388	29.57	−2.82
Greens	Salore Craig	2,821	8.03	+1.52
Family First	Rachel Hanna	1,178	3.35	−3.42
Total formal votes		35,132	95.57	−0.36
Informal votes		1,627	4.43	+0.36
Turnout		36,759	93.96	−0.16
Two-party-preferred result
Liberal	Kim Wells	22,529	64.14	+2.97
Labor	Garry Nightingale	12,598	35.86	−2.97
Liberal hold		Swing	+2.97	

=== Elections in the 2000s ===
2006 Victorian state election: Scoresby
Party	Candidate	Votes	%	±%
Liberal	Kim Wells	18,333	53.1	+1.8
Labor	Gerry Raleigh	11,181	32.4	−8.7
Family First	Peter Lake	2,338	6.8	+6.8
Greens	Rex Thompson	2,246	6.5	−1.0
People Power	John Tibble	417	1.2	+1.2
Total formal votes		34,515	95.9	−1.2
Informal votes		1,464	4.1	+1.2
Turnout		35,979	94.1	
Two-party-preferred result
Liberal	Kim Wells	21,110	61.2	+7.9
Labor	Gerry Raleigh	13,400	38.8	−7.9
Liberal hold		Swing	+7.9	

2002 Victorian state election: Scoresby
Party	Candidate	Votes	%	±%
Liberal	Kim Wells	17,617	51.3	−13.5
Labor	Pollyanne Williams	14,118	41.1	+6.0
Greens	Genevieve O'Connell	2,588	7.5	+7.5
Total formal votes		34,323	97.1	−0.5
Informal votes		1,023	2.9	+0.5
Turnout		35,346	93.8	
Two-party-preferred result
Liberal	Kim Wells	18,291	53.3	−11.5
Labor	Pollyanne Williams	16,016	46.7	+11.5
Liberal hold		Swing	−11.5	

=== Elections in the 1970s ===
1973 Victorian state election: Scoresby
Party	Candidate	Votes	%	±%
Liberal	Geoff Hayes	27,562	49.6	+7.3
Labor	Alan West	21,431	38.6	−3.8
Australia	Murray Deerbon	3,513	6.3	+6.3
Democratic Labor	Michael McMahon	3,003	5.4	−9.9
Total formal votes		55,509	97.6	+0.1
Informal votes		1,337	2.4	−0.1
Turnout		56,846	94.0	−1.3
Two-party-preferred result
Liberal	Geoff Hayes	31,767	57.2	+1.1
Labor	Alan West	23,742	42.8	−1.1
Liberal hold		Swing	+1.1	

1970 Victorian state election: Scoresby
Party	Candidate	Votes	%	±%
Labor	Alan West	15,937	42.4	+4.2
Liberal	Geoff Hayes	15,932	42.3	−2.4
Democratic Labor	Noel Clarke	5,757	15.3	−1.8
Total formal votes		37,626	97.5	+0.2
Informal votes		735	2.7	−0.2
Turnout		38,594	95.3	+0.4
Two-party-preferred result
Liberal	Geoff Hayes	21,115	56.1	−3.9
Labor	Alan West	16,511	43.9	+3.9
Liberal hold		Swing	−3.9	

=== Elections in the 1960s ===
1967 Victorian state election: Scoresby
Party	Candidate	Votes	%	±%
Liberal	Geoff Hayes	12,078	44.7	−3.5
Labor	Caroline Wilder	10,320	38.2	+1.3
Democratic Labor	Barry Brindle	4,629	17.1	+2.2
Total formal votes		27,027	97.3	
Informal votes		735	2.7	
Turnout		27,762	94.9	
Two-party-preferred result
Liberal	Geoff Hayes	16,222	60.0	−0.9
Labor	Caroline Wilder	10,805	40.0	+0.9
Liberal hold		Swing	−0.9	

1964 Victorian state election: Scoresby
Party	Candidate	Votes	%	±%
Liberal and Country	Bill Borthwick	17,207	51.5	+2.3
Labor	Caroline Wilder	12,228	36.6	−2.0
Democratic Labor	Peter Tunstall	4,004	12.0	−0.3
Total formal votes		33,439	97.9	−0.4
Informal votes		702	2.1	+0.4
Turnout		34,141	94.3	−0.5
Two-party-preferred result
Liberal and Country	Bill Borthwick	20,611	61.6	+1.8
Labor	Caroline Wilder	12,828	38.4	−1.8
Liberal and Country hold		Swing	+1.8	

1961 Victorian state election: Scoresby
Party	Candidate	Votes	%	±%
Liberal and Country	Bill Borthwick	14,023	49.2	−8.5
Labor	Ronald Wanklin	11,007	38.6	+6.1
Democratic Labor	George Noone	3,498	12.3	+2.5
Total formal votes		28,528	98.3	−0.3
Informal votes		504	1.7	+0.3
Turnout		29,032	94.8	+1.6
Two-party-preferred result
Liberal and Country	Bill Borthwick	17,060	59.8	−6.3
Labor	Ronald Wanklin	11,468	40.2	+6.3
Liberal and Country hold		Swing	−6.3	

1960 Scoresby state by-election
Party	Candidate	Votes	%	±%
Liberal and Country	Bill Borthwick	11,904	48.3	−9.4
Labor	Ronald Wanklyn	10,549	42.8	+10.3
Democratic Labor	George Noone	2,206	8.9	−0.9
Total formal votes		24,659	98.3	−0.3
Informal votes		425	1.7	+0.3
Turnout		25,084	86.7	−6.5
Two-party-preferred result
Liberal and Country	Bill Borthwick	13,779	55.9	−10.2
Labor	Ronald Wanklyn	10,880	44.1	+10.2
Liberal and Country hold		Swing	−10.2	

=== Elections in the 1950s ===
1958 Victorian state election: Scoresby
Party	Candidate	Votes	%	±%
Liberal and Country	George Knox	13,677	57.7	
Labor	Reginald Robertson	7,701	32.5	
Democratic Labor	George Noone	2,330	9.8	
Total formal votes		23,708	98.6	
Informal votes		344	1.4	
Turnout		24,052	93.2	
Two-party-preferred result
Liberal and Country	George Knox	15,657	66.1	
Labor	Reginald Robertson	8,051	33.9	
Liberal and Country hold		Swing		

1955 Victorian state election: Scoresby
Party	Candidate	Votes	%	±%
Liberal and Country	George Knox	20,234	64.2	
Labor	Reginald Robertson	11,270	35.8	
Total formal votes		31,504	98.5	
Informal votes		483	1.5	
Turnout		31,987	93.6	
Liberal and Country hold		Swing		

1952 Victorian state election: Scoresby
Party	Candidate	Votes	%	±%
Liberal and Country	George Knox	11,045	56.4	−18.1
Labor	Henry Moore	8,535	43.6	+43.6
Total formal votes		19,580	98.5	+0.3
Informal votes		288	1.5	−0.3
Turnout		19,868	92.6	−0.5
Liberal and Country hold		Swing	N/A	

1950 Victorian state election: Scoresby
Party	Candidate	Votes	%	±%
Liberal and Country	George Knox	12,036	74.5	−25.5
Independent	Esca Chambers	4,126	25.5	+25.5
Total formal votes		16,162	98.2	
Informal votes		297	1.8	
Turnout		16,459	93.1	
Liberal and Country hold		Swing	N/A	

=== Elections in the 1940s ===
1947 Victorian state election: Scoresby
Party	Candidate	Votes	%	±%
Liberal	George Knox	unopposed		
Liberal hold		Swing		

1945 Victorian state election: Scoresby
Party	Candidate	Votes	%	±%
Liberal	George Knox	unopposed		
Liberal hold		Swing		
