= Electoral results for the district of Wantirna =

Victoria, Australia, district election results

This is a list of electoral results for the electoral district of Wantirna in Victorian state elections.

== Members for Wantirna ==
Member	Party	Term
Geoff Hayes	Liberal Party	1976–1982
Don Saltmarsh	Liberal Party	1982–1985
Carolyn Hirsh	Labor Party	1985–1992
Kim Wells	Liberal Party	1992–2002

== Election results ==
=== Elections in the 1990s ===
1999 Victorian state election: Wantirna
Party	Candidate	Votes	%	±%
Liberal	Kim Wells	21,579	61.9	−0.3
Labor	Chrys Abraham	13,301	38.1	+2.3
Total formal votes		34,880	97.4	−0.6
Informal votes		931	2.6	+0.6
Turnout		35,811	94.3	
Liberal hold		Swing	−1.2	

1996 Victorian state election: Wantirna
Party	Candidate	Votes	%	±%
Liberal	Kim Wells	19,930	62.2	+2.8
Labor	Peter Bertolus	11,491	35.8	+4.6
Natural Law	Terrie Caven	645	2.0	+2.0
Total formal votes		32,066	98.0	+1.5
Informal votes		665	2.0	−1.5
Turnout		32,731	93.3	
Two-party-preferred result
Liberal	Kim Wells	20,240	63.1	−1.0
Labor	Peter Bertolus	11,814	36.9	+1.0
Liberal hold		Swing	−1.0	

1992 Victorian state election: Wantirna
Party	Candidate	Votes	%	±%
Liberal	Kim Wells	17,683	59.4	+11.4
Labor	Peter Lockwood	9,313	31.3	−17.8
Independent	John Le Fevre	2,789	9.4	+9.4
Total formal votes		29,784	96.5	0.0
Informal votes		1,076	3.5	0.0
Turnout		30,860	96.0	
Two-party-preferred result
Liberal	Kim Wells	19,046	64.1	+14.2
Labor	Peter Lockwood	10,653	35.9	−14.2
Liberal gain from Labor		Swing	+14.2	

=== Elections in the 1980s ===
1988 Victorian state election: Wantirna
Party	Candidate	Votes	%	±%
Labor	Carolyn Hirsh	14,696	51.70	−3.56
Liberal	Rob Llewellyn	12,585	44.27	−0.47
Call to Australia	John Taylor	1,144	4.02	+4.02
Total formal votes		28,425	96.72	−0.62
Informal votes		965	3.28	+0.62
Turnout		29,390	94.67	−0.69
Two-party-preferred result
Labor	Carolyn Hirsh	15,048	52.94	−2.32
Liberal	Rob Llewellyn	13,374	47.06	+2.32
Labor hold		Swing	−2.32	

1985 Victorian state election: Wantirna
Party	Candidate	Votes	%	±%
Labor	Carolyn Hirsh	14,624	55.3	+3.1
Liberal	Karen Dettmann	11,838	44.7	+5.5
Total formal votes		26,462	97.3	
Informal votes		724	2.7	
Turnout		27,186	95.4	
Labor hold		Swing	−2.1	

1982 Victorian state election: Wantirna
Party	Candidate	Votes	%	±%
Liberal	Don Saltmarsh	18,899	46.5	−5.9
Labor	Carolyn Hirsh	17,922	44.1	+8.5
Democrats	Colin Styring	3,783	9.3	−1.3
Total formal votes		40,604	98.3	+0.4
Informal votes		698	1.7	−0.4
Turnout		41,302	94.7	+0.7
Two-party-preferred result
Liberal	Don Saltmarsh	20,653	50.8	−6.8
Labor	Carolyn Hirsh	19,971	49.2	+6.8
Liberal hold		Swing	−6.8	

=== Elections in the 1970s ===
1979 Victorian state election: Wantirna
Party	Candidate	Votes	%	±%
Liberal	Geoff Hayes	17,840	52.4	−8.5
Labor	Jeffrey Kaufman	12,131	35.6	+2.0
Democrats	Colin Styring	3,602	10.6	+10.6
Australia	John Benigno	482	1.4	+1.4
Total formal votes		34,055	97.9	−0.4
Informal votes		714	2.1	+0.4
Turnout		34,769	94.0	+1.0
Two-party-preferred result
Liberal	Geoff Hayes	19,618	57.6	−8.2
Labor	Jeffrey Kaufman	14,437	42.4	+8.2
Liberal hold		Swing	−8.2	

1976 Victorian state election: Wantirna
Party	Candidate	Votes	%	±%
Liberal	Geoff Hayes	16,600	60.9	+7.3
Labor	Christopher Miller	9,170	33.6	−0.8
Democratic Labor	Clement Elliot	1,491	5.5	+0.5
Total formal votes		27,261	98.3	
Informal votes		475	1.7	
Turnout		27,736	93.0	
Two-party-preferred result
Liberal	Geoff Hayes	17,942	65.8	+4.1
Labor	Christopher Miller	9,319	34.2	−4.1
Liberal hold		Swing	+4.1	
