= Electoral results for the district of Upper Yarra =

Australian district election results

This is a list of electoral results for the electoral district of Upper Yarra in Victorian state elections.

== Members for Upper Yarra ==
Party	Member	Term
Nationalist	George Knox	1927 – 1945

== Election results ==
=== Elections in the 1940s ===
1943 Victorian state election: Upper Yarra
Party	Candidate	Votes	%	±%
United Australia	George Knox	10,307	65.0	−35.0
Labor	Arthur Fraser	3,874	24.4	+24.4
Communist	George Brown	1,674	10.6	+10.6
Total formal votes		16,185	86.6	
Informal votes		330	98.0	
Turnout		16,185	86.6	
United Australia hold		Swing	N/A	

- Preferences were not distributed.

1940 Victorian state election: Upper Yarra
Party	Candidate	Votes	%	±%
United Australia	George Knox	unopposed		
United Australia hold		Swing		

=== Elections in the 1930s ===
1937 Victorian state election: Upper Yarra
Party	Candidate	Votes	%	±%
United Australia	George Knox	unopposed		
United Australia hold		Swing		

1935 Victorian state election: Upper Yarra
Party	Candidate	Votes	%	±%
United Australia	George Knox	unopposed		
United Australia hold		Swing		

1932 Victorian state election: Upper Yarra
Party	Candidate	Votes	%	±%
United Australia	George Knox	unopposed		
United Australia hold		Swing		

=== Elections in the 1920s ===
1929 Victorian state election: Upper Yarra
Party	Candidate	Votes	%	±%
Nationalist	George Knox	unopposed		
Nationalist hold		Swing		

1927 Victorian state election: Upper Yarra
Party	Candidate	Votes	%	±%
Nationalist	George Knox	4,057	40.2	
Labor	Henry Courtney	3,076	30.5	
Independent	John Mahony	1,402	13.9	
Australian Liberal	George Ingram	554	5.5	
Country	John Dedman	503	5.0	
Independent	Henry Glynn	492	4.9	
Total formal votes		10,084	96.9	
Informal votes		327	3.1	
Turnout		10,411	90.9	
Two-party-preferred result
Nationalist	George Knox	6,320	62.7	
Labor	Henry Courtney	3,764	37.3	
Nationalist hold		Swing		
