= Longest-serving members of the Parliament of Victoria =

This is a list of the longest-serving members of the Parliament of Victoria.

== Longest serving parliamentarians ==
A list of the 15 longest-serving members of both Victoria's Legislative Assembly and Legislative Council.

List of longest-serving members of the Parliament of Victoria
| No. | Portrait | Name | Party | House | Electorate | Term began | Term ended | Time in office | Notes |
|---|---|---|---|---|---|---|---|---|---|
| 1 | Portrait of John Lemmon | John Lemmon (1875–1955) | Labor | Legislative Assembly | Williamstown | 1 June 1904 | 22 April 1955 | 50 years, 325 days | |
| 2 | Portrait of Alexander Peacock | Alexander Peacock (1861–1933) | Independent | Legislative Assembly | Clunes and Allandale | 9 April 1889 | 1 June 1904 | 44 years, 181 days | |
| 2 | Portrait of Alexander Peacock | Alexander Peacock (1861–1933) | United Australia | Legislative Assembly | Allandale | 1 June 1904 | 7 October 1933 | 44 years, 181 days | |
| 3 | Portrait of Nicholas Fitzgerald | Nicholas Fitzgerald (1829–1908) | Independent | Legislative Council | North Western Province | 29 November 1864 | November 1882 | 43 years, 262 days | |
| 3 | Portrait of Nicholas Fitzgerald | Nicholas Fitzgerald (1829–1908) | Independent | Legislative Council | North Central Province | November 1882 | 17 August 1908 | 43 years, 262 days | |
| 4 | Portrait of Frank Clarke | Frank Clarke (1879–1955) | Nationalist | Legislative Council | Northern Province | 6 June 1913 | 4 June 1925 | 41 years, 252 days | |
| 4 | Portrait of Frank Clarke | Frank Clarke (1879–1955) | United Australia | Legislative Council | Melbourne South Province | 4 June 1925 | 12 June 1937 | 41 years, 252 days | |
| 4 | Portrait of Frank Clarke | Frank Clarke (1879–1955) | Liberal and Country | Legislative Council | Monash Province | 12 June 1937 | 13 February 1955 | 41 years, 252 days | |
| 5 | Portrait of James Balfour | James Balfour (1830–1913) | Independent | Legislative Assembly | East Bourke | 12 February 1866 | 19 August 1868 | 41 years, 243 days | |
| 5 | Portrait of James Balfour | James Balfour (1830–1913) | Independent | Legislative Council | Southern Province | 30 June 1874 | 30 November 1882 | 41 years, 243 days | |
| 5 | Portrait of James Balfour | James Balfour (1830–1913) | Independent | Legislative Council | South Eastern Province | 30 November 1882 | 1 June 1904 | 41 years, 243 days | |
| 5 | Portrait of James Balfour | James Balfour (1830–1913) | Independent | Legislative Council | East Yarra Province | 1 June 1904 | 24 August 1913 | 41 years, 243 days | |
| 6 | Portrait of Albert Lind | Albert Lind (1878–1964) | United Country Party | Legislative Assembly | Gippsland East | 21 October 1920 | 15 July 1961 | 40 years, 267 days | |
| 7 | Portrait of Bill Slater | Bill Slater (1890–1960) | Labor | Legislative Assembly | Dundas | 15 November 1917 | 14 May 1932 | 40 years, 244 days | |
| 7 | Portrait of Bill Slater | Bill Slater (1890–1960) | Labor | Legislative Assembly | Dundas | 6 September 1932 | 8 November 1947 | 40 years, 244 days | |
| 7 | Portrait of Bill Slater | Bill Slater (1890–1960) | Labor | Legislative Council | Doutta Galla Province | 18 June 1949 | 19 June 1960 | 40 years, 244 days | |
| 8 | Portrait of Ewen Hugh Cameron | Ewen Hugh Cameron (1831–1915) | Commonwealth Liberal | Legislative Assembly | Evelyn | 19 May 1874 | 26 November 1914 | 40 years, 191 days | |
| 9 | Portrait of Herbert Hyland | Herbert Hyland (1884–1970) | Country | Legislative Assembly | Gippsland South | 30 November 1929 | 18 March 1970 | 40 years, 108 days | |
| 10 | Portrait of William Angliss | William Angliss (1865–1957) | Liberal and Country | Legislative Council | Southern Province | 21 June 1912 | 21 June 1952 | 40 years, 0 days | |
| 11 | Portrait of Tom Tunnecliffe | Tom Tunnecliffe (1869–1948) | Labor | Legislative Assembly | West Melbourne | 15 December 1903 | 1 June 1904 | 39 years, 358 days | |
| 11 | Portrait of Tom Tunnecliffe | Tom Tunnecliffe (1869–1948) | Labor | Legislative Assembly | Eaglehawk | 15 March 1907 | 21 October 1920 | 39 years, 358 days | |
| 11 | Portrait of Tom Tunnecliffe | Tom Tunnecliffe (1869–1948) | Labor | Legislative Assembly | Collingwood | 30 August 1921 | 30 July 1947 | 39 years, 358 days | |
| 12 | Portrait of William Edgar | William Edgar (1858–1948) | United Australia | Legislative Council | Melbourne West Province | 1 June 1904 | 6 June 1913 | 39 years, 342 days | |
| 12 | Portrait of William Edgar | William Edgar (1858–1948) | United Australia | Legislative Council | East Yarra Province | 5 July 1917 | 6 June 1948 | 39 years, 342 days | |
| 13 | Portrait of George Prendergast | George Prendergast (1854–1937) | Labor | Legislative Assembly | North Melbourne | 4 October 1894 | 28 September 1897 | 39 years, 295 days | |
| 13 | Portrait of George Prendergast | George Prendergast (1854–1937) | Labor | Legislative Assembly | North Melbourne | 1 November 1900 | 9 April 1927 | 39 years, 295 days | |
| 13 | Portrait of George Prendergast | George Prendergast (1854–1937) | Labor | Legislative Assembly | Footscray | 9 April 1927 | 28 August 1937 | 39 years, 295 days | |
| 14 | Portrait of William Edgar | John Cain Sr (1882–1957) | Labor | Legislative Assembly | Jika Jika | 15 November 1917 | 4 March 1927 | 39 years, 226 days | |
| 14 | Portrait of William Edgar | John Cain Sr (1882–1957) | Labor | Legislative Assembly | Northcote | 9 April 1927 | 4 August 1957 | 39 years, 226 days | |
| 15 | Portrait of James Jewell | James Jewell (1869–1949) | Labor | Legislative Assembly | Brunswick | 14 March 1910 | 14 May 1949 | 39 years, 61 days | |

== Father of the Legislative Assembly ==
| Name | Term length | Time as Father | Notes |
|---|---|---|---|
| Charles Gavan Duffy | 1 November 1856 – 1 August 1864 1 August 1867 – 1 March 1874 1 August 1876 – 1 February 1880 | 2 February 1861 – 1 July 1861 150 days | |
| Edward Henty | 1 November 1856 – 1 July 1861 | 2 February 1861 – 1 July 1861 150 days | |
| Francis Murphy | 1 November 1856 – 1 December 1865 1 February 1866 – 1 January 1871 | 2 February 1861 – 1 July 1861 150 days | |
| John Myles | 1 November 1856 – 1 July 1861 | 2 February 1861 – 1 July 1861 150 days | |
| John O’Shanassy | 1 November 1856 – 1 December 1865 1 May 1877 – 1 February 1883 | 2 February 1861 – 1 July 1861 150 days | |
| Charles Gavan Duffy | 1 November 1856 – 1 August 1864 1 August 1867 – 1 March 1874 1 August 1876 – 1 February 1880 | 2 July 1861 – 1 August 1864 1,127 days | |
| Francis Murphy | 1 November 1856 – 1 December 1865 1 February 1866 – 1 January 1871 | 2 July 1861 – 1 August 1864 1,127 days | |
| John O’Shanassy | 1 November 1856 – 1 December 1865 1 May 1877 – 1 February 1883 | 2 July 1861 – 1 August 1864 1,127 days | |
| Francis Murphy | 1 November 1856 – 1 December 1865 1 February 1866 – 1 January 1871 | 2 August 1864 – 1 December 1865 487 days | |
| John O’Shanassy | 1 November 1856 – 1 December 1865 1 May 1877 – 1 February 1883 | 2 August 1864 – 1 December 1865 487 days | |
| James Macpherson Grant | 1 November 1856 – 1 August 1859 1 October 1859 – 1 July 1870 1 April 1871 – 1 April 1885 | 2 December 1865 – 1 July 1870 1,673 days | |
| Peter Lalor | 1 November 1856 – 1 August 1859 1 October 1859 – 1 January 1871 1 May 1874 – 1 April 1877 1 May 1877 – 1 February 1889 | 2 December 1865 – 1 July 1870 1,673 days | |
| Peter Lalor | 1 November 1856 – 1 August 1859 1 October 1859 – 1 January 1871 1 May 1874 – 1 April 1877 1 May 1877 – 1 February 1889 | 2 July 1870 – 1 January 1871 184 days | |
| John Smith | 1 November 1856 – 1 August 1859 1 October 1859 – 1 July 1861 1 August 1861 – 1 January 1879 | 2 January 1871 – 1 January 1879 2,922 days | |
| James Macpherson Grant | 1 November 1856 – 1 August 1859 1 October 1859 – 1 July 1870 1 April 1871 – 1 April 1885 | 2 January 1879 – 1 April 1885 2,282 days | |
| Peter Lalor | 1 November 1856 – 1 August 1859 1 October 1859 – 1 January 1871 1 May 1874 – 1 April 1877 1 May 1877 – 1 February 1889 | 2 April 1885 – 1 February 1889 1,402 days | |
| Duncan Gillies | 1 February 1861 – 1 May 1868 1 March 1870 – 1 April 1877 1 May 1877 – 1 October 1877 1 November 1877 – 1 March 1889 1 April 1889 – 1 January 1894 1 October 1897 – 1 September 1903 | 2 February 1889 – 1 March 1889 28 days | |
| William McLellan | 1 October 1859 – 1 April 1877 1 February 1883 – 1 September 1897 | 2 March 1889 – 31 March 1889 30 days | |
| Duncan Gillies | 1 February 1861 – 1 May 1868 1 March 1870 – 1 April 1877 1 May 1877 – 1 October 1877 1 November 1877 – 1 March 1889 1 April 1889 – 1 January 1894 1 October 1897 – 1 September 1903 | 1 April 1889 – 1 January 1894 1,737 days | |
| William McLellan | 1 October 1859 – 1 April 1877 1 February 1883 – 1 September 1897 | 2 January 1894 – 1 September 1897 1,339 days | |
| Jonas Levien | 1 April 1871 – 1 April 1877 1 May 1877 – 1 December 1877 1 May 1880 – 1 May 1906 | 2 September 1897 – 30 September 1897 29 days | |
| Duncan Gillies | 1 February 1861 – 1 May 1868 1 March 1870 – 1 April 1877 1 May 1877 – 1 October 1877 1 November 1877 – 1 March 1889 1 April 1889 – 1 January 1894 1 October 1897 – 1 September 1903 | 1 October 1897 – 1 September 1903 2,161 days | |
| Jonas Levien | 1 April 1871 – 1 April 1877 1 May 1877 – 1 December 1877 1 May 1880 – 1 May 1906 | 2 September 1903 – 1 May 1906 973 days | |
| Ewen Hugh Cameron | 1 May 1874 – 1 November 1914 | 2 May 1906 – 1 November 1914 3,106 days | |
| John Murray | 1 June 1884 – 1 May 1916 | 2 November 1914 – 1 May 1916 547 days | |
| Alfred Richard Outtrim | 1 December 1885 – 1 April 1892 1 May 1892 – 1 September 1902 1 June 1904 – 1 September 1920 | 2 May 1916 – 1 September 1920 1,584 days | |
| Alexander Peacock | 1 April 1889 – 1 May 1904 1 June 1904 – 1 October 1933 | 2 September 1920 – 1 October 1933 4,778 days | |
| Richard Toutcher | 1 October 1897 – 1 May 1904 1 June 1904 – 1 February 1935 | 2 October 1933 – 1 February 1935 488 days | |
| George Prendergast | 1 October 1894 – 1 September 1897 1 November 1900 – 1 December 1926 1 July 1927 – 1 August 1937 | 2 February 1935 – 1 August 1937 912 days | |
| John Lemmon | 1 June 1904 – 1 April 1955 | 2 August 1937 – 1 April 1955 6,452 days | |
| John Cain Sr | 1 November 1917 – 1 March 1927 1 April 1927 – 1 August 1957 | 2 April 1955 – 1 August 1957 853 days | |
| Albert Lind | 1 October 1920 – 1 June 1961 | 2 August 1957 – 1 June 1961 1,400 days | |
| Herbert Hyland | 1 November 1929 – 1 March 1970 | 2 June 1961 – 1 March 1970 3,195 days | |
| Clive Stoneham | 1 November 1942 – 1 October 1945 1 November 1945 – 1 April 1970 | 2 March 1970 – 1 April 1970 31 days | |
| George Moss | 10 November 1945 – 18 May 1973 | 2 April 1970 – 18 May 1973 1,143 days | |
| Tom Mitchell | 7 June 1947 – 19 March 1976 | 19 May 1973 – 19 March 1976 1,036 days | |
| Jim Balfour | 28 May 1955 – 2 April 1982 | 20 March 1976 – 4 May 1979 1,141 days | |
| Joe Rafferty | 28 May 1955 – 4 May 1979 | 20 March 1976 – 4 May 1979 1,141 days | |
| Sam Loxton | 28 May 1955 – 4 May 1979 | 20 March 1976 – 4 May 1979 1,141 days | |
| Jim Balfour | 28 May 1955 – 2 April 1982 | 5 May 1979 – 2 April 1982 1,064 days | |
| Frank Wilkes | 21 September 1957 – 30 September 1988 | 3 April 1982 – 30 September 1988 2,373 days | |
| Bruce Evans | 15 July 1961 – 2 October 1992 | 1 October 1988 – 2 October 1992 1,463 days | |
| Ian Smith | 29 April 1967 – 1 March 1983 2 March 1985 – 17 September 1999 | 3 October 1992 – 17 September 1999 2,541 days | |
| Rob Maclellan | 30 May 1970 – 29 November 2002 | 18 September 1999 – 29 November 2002 1,169 days | |
| Ken Jasper | 1 March 1976 – 1 November 2010 | 30 November 2002 – 1 November 2010 2,894 days | |
| George Seitz | 17 July 1982 – 26 November 2010 | 2 November 2010 – 26 November 2010 25 days | |
| Denis Napthine | 1 October 1988 – 3 September 2015 | 27 November 2010 – 3 September 2015 1,742 days | |
| Robert Clark | 1 October 1988 – 18 December 2018 | 27 November 2010 – 3 September 2015 1,742 days | |
| Robert Clark | 1 October 1988 – 18 December 2018 | 4 September 2015 – 18 December 2018 1,202 days | |
| Kim Wells | 3 October 1992 – present | 19 December 2018 – present 2,854 days (through 11 October 2026) | |

== See also ==
- List of longest-serving members of the Parliament of Australia
