= George Mercer (disambiguation) =

George Mercer (1944–1989) was the first person to be executed in Missouri since 1965.

George Mercer may also refer to:

- George Mercer (military officer) (1733–1784), American surveyor, military officer, and politician from Virginia
- George Mercer (merchant) (1772–1853), Scottish merchant and landholder
- George Duncan Mercer (1814–1884), his son, pastoralist in Australia
