= Electoral results for the district of Rowville =

Victoria, Australia, district election results

This is a list of electoral results for the Electoral district of Rowville in Victorian state elections in Victoria, Australia.

== Members for Rowville ==
| Member | Party | Term |
|---|---|---|
| Kim Wells | Liberal | 2014–present |

== Election results ==
=== Elections in the 2020s ===
2022 Victorian state election: Rowville
| Party | Candidate | Votes | % | ±% |
|---|---|---|---|---|
| Liberal | Kim Wells | 17,600 | 40.6 | −10.3 |
| Labor | Mannie Kaur Verma | 14,283 | 32.9 | −2.8 |
| Independent | Nicole Seymour | 5,231 | 12.1 | +12.1 |
| Greens | Angelica Di Camillo | 3,055 | 7.0 | −2.4 |
| Family First | Stephen Burgess | 1,433 | 3.3 | +3.3 |
| Freedom | Peterine Elizabeth Smulders | 908 | 2.1 | +2.1 |
| Animal Justice | Diane Glenane | 859 | 2.0 | +2.0 |
| Total formal votes | | 43,369 | 95.4 | +1.3 |
| Informal votes | | 2,070 | 4.6 | −1.3 |
| Turnout | | 45,439 | 91.4 | |
Two-party-preferred result
| Liberal | Kim Wells | 23,274 | 53.7 | −1.8 |
| Labor | Mannie Kaur Verma | 20,095 | 46.3 | +1.8 |
| Liberal hold | | Swing | −1.8 | |

=== Elections in the 2010s ===
2018 Victorian state election: Rowville
| Party | Candidate | Votes | % | ±% |
|---|---|---|---|---|
| Liberal | Kim Wells | 17,551 | 50.39 | −3.45 |
| Labor | Muhammad Shahbaz | 11,940 | 34.28 | −1.37 |
| Greens | Natasha Sharma | 3,483 | 10.00 | +2.63 |
| Independent | Joe Cossari | 1,858 | 5.33 | +5.33 |
| Total formal votes | | 34,832 | 94.04 | −0.42 |
| Informal votes | | 2,207 | 5.96 | +0.42 |
| Turnout | | 37,039 | 92.85 | −2.13 |
Two-party-preferred result
| Liberal | Kim Wells | 19,373 | 55.69 | −2.72 |
| Labor | Muhammad Shahbaz | 15,416 | 44.31 | +2.72 |
| Liberal hold | | Swing | −2.72 | |

2014 Victorian state election: Rowville
| Party | Candidate | Votes | % | ±% |
|---|---|---|---|---|
| Liberal | Kim Wells | 18,758 | 53.8 | −3.5 |
| Labor | Tamika Hicks | 12,419 | 35.7 | +5.7 |
| Greens | Tim Wise | 2,566 | 7.4 | +0.8 |
| Rise Up Australia | Leanne Price | 1,096 | 3.2 | +3.1 |
| Total formal votes | | 34,839 | 94.5 | −0.3 |
| Informal votes | | 2,042 | 5.5 | +0.3 |
| Turnout | | 36,881 | 95.0 | +3.0 |
Two-party-preferred result
| Liberal | Kim Wells | 20,363 | 58.4 | −4.7 |
| Labor | Tamika Hicks | 14,499 | 41.6 | +4.7 |
| Liberal hold | | Swing | −4.7 | |
