= Electoral district of Grant (Victorian Legislative Council) =

Former electoral district of the Victorian Legislative Council

Coordinates: 37°50′S 144°10′E

District of Grant Victoria—Legislative Council
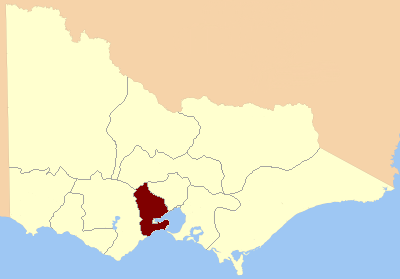
- Location in Victoria
- State: Victoria
- Created: 1851
- Abolished: 1856
- Demographic: Rural

The Electoral district of Grant was one of the sixteen electoral districts of the original unicameral Victorian Legislative Council (Australia) of 1851 to 1856.

It was based on the County of Grant and was bound by the "Werribee River from its mouth to its source in the great dividing range ... Yarrowee River on the west and south-west ... Barwon River ... Salt Creek to the sea coast north of Point Roadknight on the south by the sea coast ... to the mouth of the Werribee River ..." (Excluding the town of Geelong).

From 1856, the Parliament of Victoria consisted of two houses, the Victorian Legislative Council (upper house, consisting of Provinces) and the Victorian Legislative Assembly (lower house).

== Members ==
One member initially, two from the expansion of the Council in 1853.

Member 1	Term		
John Henry Mercer	Nov. 1851 – Dec. 1852	Member 2	Term
John Myles	Dec. 1852^{[b]} – Mar. 1856	William Haines	Aug. 1853 – Dec. 1854^{[r]}
John Myles	Dec. 1852^{[b]} – Mar. 1856	Horatio Wills	Jan. 1855 – Mar. 1856

== See also ==
- Parliaments of the Australian states and territories
- List of members of the Victorian Legislative Council

== Notes ==
^{r} = resigned
^{b} = by-election

Haines, Myles and Wills all were later elected to the Electoral district of South Grant, part of the first Victorian Legislative Assembly in November 1856.
