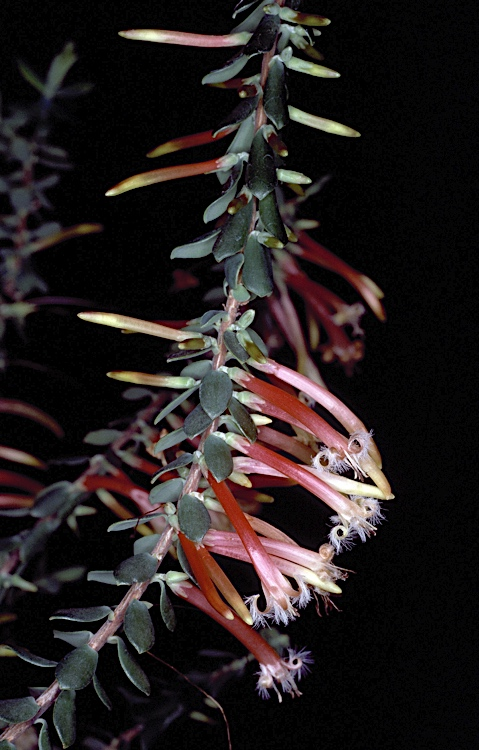
- In the Australian National Botanic Gardens

Scientific classification
- Kingdom: Plantae
- Clade: Tracheophytes
- Clade: Angiosperms
- Clade: Eudicots
- Clade: Asterids
- Order: Ericales
- Family: Ericaceae
- Genus: Styphelia
- Species: S. hainesii

Binomial name
- Styphelia hainesii F.Muell.

= Styphelia hainesii =

Species of plant

Styphelia hainesii is a species of flowering plant in the heath family Ericaceae and is endemic to the south coast of Western Australia. It is a bushy shrub with egg-shaped leaves, the narrower end towards the base, and red, tube-shaped flowers arranged singly in leaf axils.

== Description ==
Styphelia hainesii is a bushy shrub that typically grows to a height of 0.3–2 m (1 ft 0 in – 6 ft 7 in). Its leaves are egg-shaped with the narrower end towards the base, 6.3–10.5 mm (0.25–0.41 in) long, rarely with a small, sharp point on the tip. The flowers are usually borne singly or pairs in leaf axils and are nearly sessile with broad, blunt bracteoles less than 4 mm (0.16 in) long. The sepals are almost pointed, about 13 mm (0.51 in) long, the petals red, nearly 19 mm (0.75 in) long and joined at the base, forming a tube with 5 dense tufts of hairs inside, above the base. Flowering occurs from March to November.

== Taxonomy ==
Styphelia hainesii was first described in 1864 by Ferdinand von Mueller in his Fragmenta phytographiae Australiae. The specific epithet (hainesii) honours William Haines.

== Distribution and habitat ==
This styphelia occurs in sandy soils over limestone in limestone slopes, sand dunes and flats in near-coastal sites in the Coolgardie, Esperance Plains, Hampton and Mallee bioregions of southern Western Australia.

== Conservation status ==
Styphelia hainesii is listed as "not threatened" by the Western Australian Government Department of Biodiversity, Conservation and Attractions.
