= Electoral district of Monbulk =

State electoral district of Victoria, Australia

Monbulk Victoria—Legislative Assembly
- Interactive map of electoral district boundaries from the 2022 state election
- State: Victoria
- Created: 1967
- MP: Daniela De Martino
- Party: Labor Party
- Namesake: Monbulk, Victoria
- Electors: 43,324 (2018)
- Area: 459 km^{2} (177.2 sq mi)
- Demographic: Outer metropolitan
Electorates around Monbulk:
Bayswater	Evelyn	Eildon
Rowville	Monbulk	Narracan
Narre Warren South; Berwick	Pakenham	Narracan

The electoral district of Monbulk is an electoral district of the Victorian Legislative Assembly. It is situated in the Dandenong Ranges on the outskirts of Melbourne. It includes the towns of Monbulk, Olinda and Silvan as well as some outer suburbs such as Belgrave and Tecoma.

The Puffing Billy Railway forms part of the boundary of the electorate, other tourist attractions within the electorate include Mount Dandenong and the Dandenong Ranges National Park, Yellingbo Nature Conservation Reserve and the Silvan Reservoir.

For its first three decades, it was a bellwether seat held by the party of government. It was held by the Liberals from 1967 to 1982 before falling to Labor in the landslide that brought John Cain to power. The Liberals won it back in 1992 as Jeff Kennett won government. While they held onto it in 1999 when Kennett was defeated by Steve Bracks, current Labor member James Merlino won it in 2002 and has held it since. It appears to be trending toward Labor in recent years; Merlino held onto it in 2010 even as Labor lost government, and retained it on a healthy swing in 2014 when a redistribution made it notionally Liberal. Merlino is the former Deputy Premier of Victoria - the second Deputy Premier to hold this seat after Bill Borthwick.

== Members for Monbulk ==
Member	Party	Term
Bill Borthwick	Liberal	1967–1982
Neil Pope	Labor	1982–1992
Steve McArthur	Liberal	1992–2002
James Merlino	Labor	2002–2022
Daniela De Martino	Labor	2022–present

== Election results ==
2022 Victorian state election: Monbulk
Party	Candidate	Votes	%	±%
Labor	Daniela De Martino	15,071	36.1	−6.0
Liberal	Gareth Ward	12,327	29.5	−8.1
Greens	Michael Ormsby	6,255	15.0	−1.2
Independent	Johanna Skelton	2,229	5.3	+5.3
Ind. (Australia One)	Craig Cole	2,069	5.0	+5.0
Animal Justice	Leah Folloni	1,739	4.2	+4.0
Family First	David Higgins	1,197	2.9	+2.9
Freedom	Veronica Barnes	910	2.2	+2.2
Total formal votes		41,797	95.3	+0.3
Informal votes		2,063	4.7	−0.3
Turnout		43,860	90.4	−4.1
Two-party-preferred result
Labor	Daniela De Martino	24,056	57.6	+0.5
Liberal	Gareth Ward	17,741	42.4	–0.5
Labor hold		Swing	+0.5	
