= Currency lads and lasses =

Term for Australians of European descent

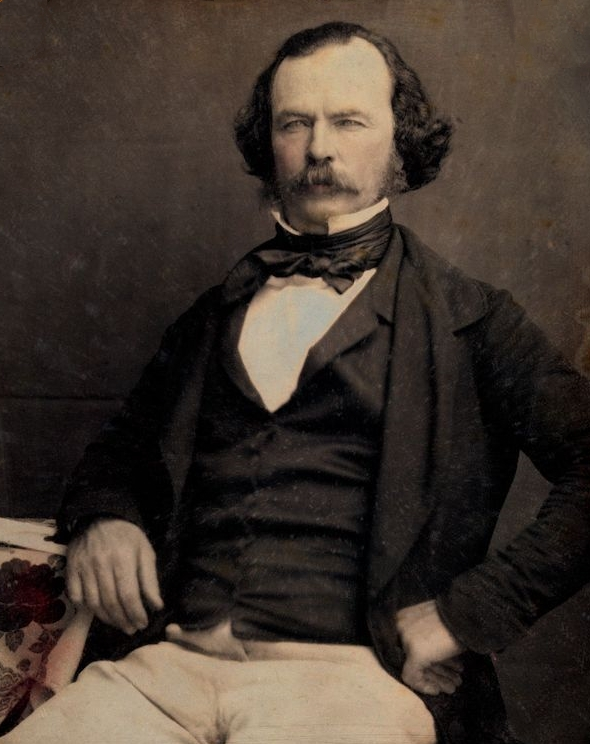
Born in Sydney of a convict father, Horatio Wills exalted native-born Australians ("currency lads and lasses") in his newspaper The Currency Lad.

Currency lads and lasses (collectively known as currency or the currency) were the first generations of native-born white Australians. They were the children of the British settlers and convicts who arrived in the late 18th and early 19th centuries, beginning with the First Fleet in 1788.

== Origin ==
In the early years of the Colony of New South Wales, the term "currency" was used to refer to any money other than pound sterling, which was the only legal tender. Owing to a shortage of sterling, "currency" circulated freely, but was not always accepted – the term carried implications of illegality, inferior quality, and subordination. By analogy, the children of convicts came to be known as "currency", in contrast to those born from exclusives, the "sterling". The first reference in print to the native-born being called "currency" was in the Sydney Gazette of 13 September 1822, in a letter signed by "Lydia Languish" calling for more social events to be organised for "currency lasses".

== Usage ==
As applied to people rather than money, the term originally had derogatory connotations – by the early 1820s, "currency had stuck for male and female native-born and everyone knew what it implied". However, it was soon reclaimed by the native-born as a positive term, in order to distinguish themselves from more recent arrivals. In Two Years in New South Wales, published in 1827, Peter Miller Cunningham wrote: "Our colonial-born brethren are best known here by the name of Currency, in contradistinction to Sterling, or those born in the mother-country. The name was originally given by a facetious paymaster of the 73rd Regiment quartered here–the pound currency being at that time inferior to the pound sterling." In 1832, Horatio Wills – born in Sydney in 1811 to a convict father – founded The Currency Lad. It was "the first newspaper published in the colony which specifically set out to protect the interests of the native-born".

"The currency" as a whole were usually separated according to gender as "currency lads" and "currency lasses." In 1849, J. P. Townsend wrote: "whites born in the colony...are...called 'the currency;' and thus the 'Currency Lass' is a favourite name for colonial vessels," and, according to Edward E. Morris, also for hotels. In 1852, the term was still being used: "A singular disinclination to finish any work completely, is a striking characteristic of colonial craftsmen, at least of the 'currency' or native-born portion." However, when Morris published his Austral English in 1898, he indicated that the term was obsolete.

== See also ==
- Australian Natives' Association
- Criollo people
- First white child in Australia
