= Horatio Wills =

Australian politician

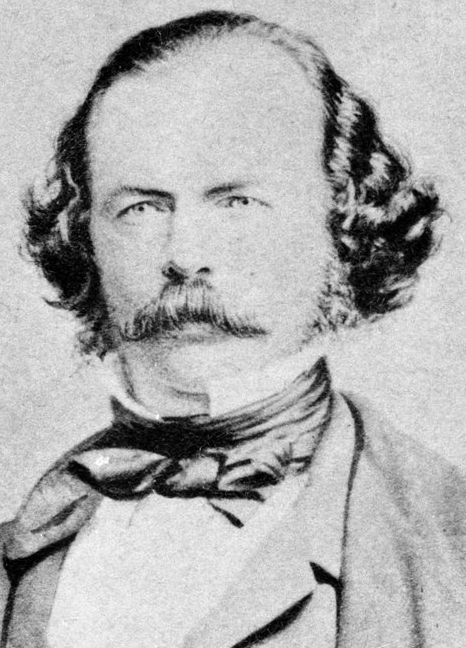
- Horatio Wills circa 1850s
- Born: Horatio Spencer Howe Wills; 5 October 1811; Sydney, New South Wales, Australia
- Died: 17 October 1861 (aged 50); Cullin-la-ringo, Queensland, Australia
- Occupations: Pastoralist, politician, newspaper owner
- Known for: The Sydney Gazette, The Currency Lad
- Children: 9, including Tom

Horatio Spencer Howe Wills (5 October 1811 – 17 October 1861) was an Australian pastoralist, politician and newspaper owner.

== Biography ==
Born in Sydney in the British penal colony of New South Wales, Wills grew up on George Street with his mother Sarah Harding, a free settler, and his step father George Howe, a convict. Wills' father Edward Spencer Wills, a convict who was transported in 1799 for highway robbery, died five months before his birth.

Wills worked as a printer and editor for Australia's first newspaper, The Sydney Gazette, before founding his own journal, The Currency Lad, in 1832. In it, he promoted the interests of "currency lads and lasses" (native-born white Australians) and made the earliest arguments for a form of Australian republicanism, prefiguring the nationalist attitudes of the late 19th century. He fathered nine children, including Tom Wills, Australia's first great cricketer and founder of Australian rules football.

In the late 1830s, Wills took up pastoralism and overlanded with his family to the Grampians region of the Port Phillip District (now the state of Victoria). Wills was one of the first settlers in the area, and purchased a 125,000-acre (510 km^{2}) property named Lexington near Moyston. He built a house on the property; completed in 1845, it still exists and is now heritage-listed. While at Lexington he is credited as having named nearby Mount Ararat, from which the city of Ararat takes its name. He hired local Aboriginal people, the Djab wurrung, as station hands and harvesters on his property.

In 1852, Wills sold Lexington and moved to Belle Vue in Geelong. Wills was elected to the Victorian Legislative Council for Grant on 10 January 1855; and was elected to the Victorian Legislative Assembly for South Grant in November 1856, a position he held until August 1859.

In 1861, Horatio moved north to Queensland, at Cullin-la-ringo in the Nogoa region near Rockhampton. Less than three weeks later, Wills was murdered by aborigines, along with 18 of his employees at the Cullin-la-ringo massacre, 17 October 1861; the largest massacre of whites by Aboriginal people in Australian history.

== Sources ==
Victorian Legislative Council
Preceded by William Haines	Member for Grant; January 1855 – March 1856; With: John Myles	Original Council abolished
Victorian Legislative Assembly
New district	Member for South Grant; November 1856 – August 1859; With: William Haines 1856–58; John Bell 1859; John Myles 1856–59	Succeeded by Peter Lalor; James Carr
