= 1856 Victorian colonial election =

- 23 September to 24 October 1856

All 60 seats in the Victorian Legislative Assembly 31 seats needed for a majority
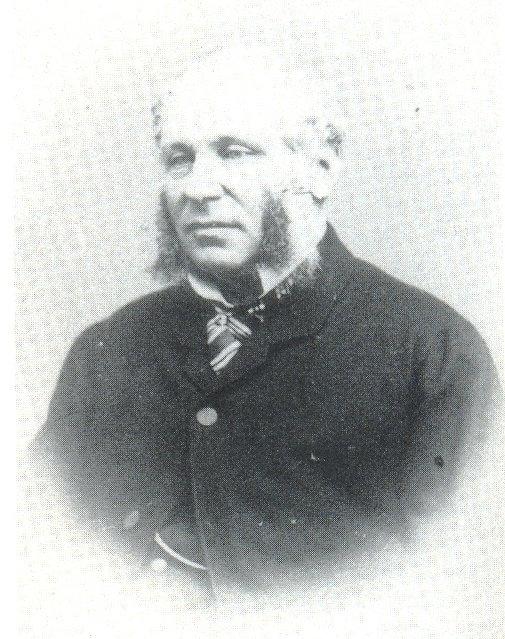

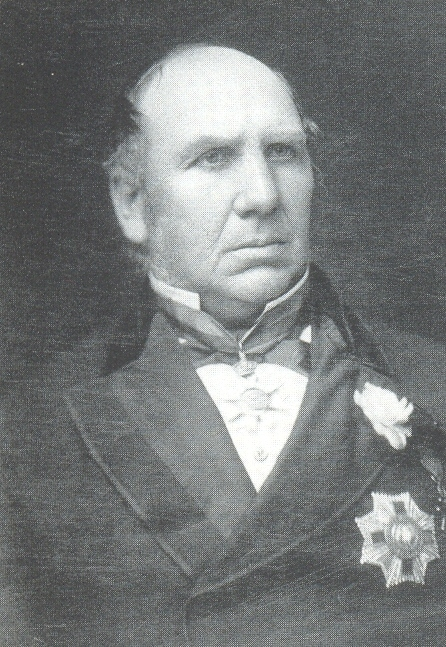
	First party	Second party
Leader	William Haines	John O'Shanassy
Party	Government	Opposition
Leader's seat	South Grant	Kilmore
Seats won	11	25
Percentage	11.99	35.13
Premier before election
William Haines
Elected Premier
William Haines

The 1856 Victorian colonial election was held from 23 September to 24 October 1856 to elect the first Parliament of Victoria. All 60 seats in 37 electorates in the Legislative Assembly were up for election, though eight seats were uncontested. The eligibility to vote at the 1856 Victorian election was subject to a property qualification. The voting was carried out by secret ballot.

There were 20 single-member, 14 two-member and one each of three-member, four-member and five-member electorates.

The historian Henry Gyles Turner, writing in 1904, described the election in the following terms: "The voting was largely controlled by personal feeling and private influences, for there was no stirring party cry in the ascendant, and the quieting effect of the voting by secret ballot made strongly for orderliness in the proceedings". William Haines formed the first ministry after the election, a continuation of his previous role in the Legislative Council, even though his government was potentially in the minority in the lower house.

== Results ==
Legislative Assembly (FPTP)^{[A]}
Party / Grouping	Votes	%	Seats
Government	6,120	11.99	11
Opposition	17,940	35.13	25
Crossbench	6,808	13.33	20
Unspecified	20,193	39.55	4
Totals	51,061	100.00	60

== Background to the election ==
After the colony of Victoria was separated from New South Wales in July 1851 the first Legislative Council was established. Two-thirds of its members were elected and one-third was appointed by Charles La Trobe, the colony's first lieutenant-governor. In December 1854 William Haines was appointed to the position of colonial secretary, the senior local official representing the government in the Legislative Council. At that time the colonial secretary acted under instructions from the lieutenant-governor who, in turn, followed orders from London. The British government had committed to self-government in local affairs for the colony of Victoria, under a constitution to be framed by the colonists themselves. Haines was a member of the committee that drafted the new constitution in 1853. The constitution was passed in the Legislative Council in 1854 and eventually endorsed by the British parliament after some amendments. News reached the colony in October 1855 that the Constitution Act had received the royal assent. The governor, Charles Hotham, declared a public holiday for 23 November 1855, the date of its proclamation.

The responsibility for local affairs was effectively handed over to the colonists when the new constitution came into force. Governor Hotham appointed Legislative Council members in charge of government departments as ministers in the transition government prior to the establishment of a bicameral parliament. Haines, as the leading official, took on the post of chief secretary and soon afterwards the colonial newspapers began referring to him as the premier. Although there were no firm party loyalties at this stage it was essentially a conservative ministry, described by The Age newspaper as "an oligarchical clique". In order to carry out an election for a new Legislative Assembly, the existing Legislative Council needed to pass electoral laws, a process that commenced in December 1855.

The ministry led by Haines faced an early setback during debate on the principle of a secret ballot. William Nicholson, previously mayor of Melbourne, put forward a motion that voting by secret ballot should be embodied in the electoral provisions, a proposal vehemently opposed by Haines and his ministry. Nicholson's motion was carried on 18 December 1855, prompting Haines and his ministry to resign. Nicholson was asked to form a government, for which he had no enthusiasm, and the Haines ministry resumed office on December 29. Haines then agreed that the question of a secret ballot "should be an open, and not a ministerial, question". The practical system of secret voting was devised by Henry Chapman and incorporated in the electoral laws. The Electoral Act, which included provisions facilitating the election of a Legislative Assembly, was eventually passed in March 1856.

== Aftermath ==
Twenty of the newly elected members of the Legislative Assembly, including William Haines, had previously served in the Legislative Council. Haines was a successful candidate for the South Grant electorate and led the first ministry, though from the outset there was uncertainty as to whether his government could consistently command a majority in parliament. During the first few months of sittings the Haines ministry faced an opposition dominated by John O'Shanassy and Charles Gavan Duffy. On several occasions the government lost votes in the house, but any response by Haines did not go beyond threatening to resign. On 3 March 1857, however, O'Shanassy and his supporters carried a resolution censuring the government for the alleged misappropriation of immigration funds which led to the resignation of the Haines ministry.

O'Shanassy became premier on 11 March 1857 but he faced difficulties in commanding a stable majority, especially after three members of his cabinet were defeated in ministerial by-elections. After seven weeks of nominal power the ministry resigned in April 1857 after a no-confidence resolution was carried in parliament. After O'Shanassy resigned the leader of the parliamentary liberal faction, James McCulloch, was entrusted to form a new ministry. McCulloch made attempts to form a coalition to unite the competing factions, but O'Shanassy refused his overtures. Haines was more amenable and resumed office as chief secretary and premier, with McCulloch as minister for trade and customs. The principal reforms of the Legislative Assembly during 1857 were the abolition of the property qualification for members (passed in February, but not finalised until August) and the committal to universal manhood suffrage (passed in November 1857).

In February 1858 the government proposed a bill to increase the number of members of the Assembly and to establish equal electorates based on the principle of one vote one value. After a resolution condemning one of the schedules of the bill was passed on 23 February 1858 by a majority of twenty-six to seventeen, Haines and his colleagues once again resigned. O'Shanassy formed a new ministry that took office on March 10. The new administration continued the task of amending the electoral bill, including the determination of electoral boundaries. The proposed number of members was eventually decided at seventy-eight, but the concept of equal electorates was dropped from the bill. In October 1858, after accepting amendments by the Legislative Council, the electoral bill became law, to come into force in May 1859.

The first parliament of the colony of Victoria had its last sitting on 24 February 1859. Duffy resigned from O'Shanassy's ministry in March 1859 over differences in land policy. During the interregnum the alterations of the electoral machinery were carried out, including the compilation of new rolls for the election that commenced in August 1859.

== See also ==
- Members of the Victorian Legislative Assembly, 1856–1859

== Notes ==
A.Most of the elected members were described as 'Government', 'Opposition' or 'Crossbench' according to a list published in the Hansard for 21 November 1856. Unsuccessful candidates (and four of the elected members) were listed without classification. The number of votes cast for unsuccessful candidates accounts for the large number of votes classified as 'unspecified' in the Results table.
