= John Mercer (Australian pastoralist) =

Australian politician

John Henry Mercer (4 January 1823 – 8 December 1891) was a landowner, pastoralist and politician in colonial Victoria (Australia).

Mercer born in Midlothian, Scotland, the son of George Dempster Mercer and Frances Charlotte Reid. Mercer was a pastoralist with his brother George Duncan Mercer and cousin William Drummond Mercer in properties near Geelong. Mercer was elected to the district of Grant in the inaugural Victorian Legislative Council on 16 September 1851.

Mercer left the Council in December 1852, he became commissioner of insolvent estates and chairman of the water commission. In 1857 Mercer had the Gheringhap freehold mapped as the Dryden estate. Mercer later returned to Scotland where he married Anne Catherine Anstruther on 11 December 1861. Mercer died in Huntingtower, Perthshire on 8 December 1891.

Victorian Legislative Council
New creation	Member for Grant; 16 September 1851 – December 1852	Succeeded by John Myles
