= Owen Walsh =

Administrator of Norfolk Island
- In office 2 October 2008 – 30 March 2012
- Monarch: Elizabeth II
- Governor-General: Quentin Bryce
- Preceded by: Grant Tambling
- Succeeded by: Neil Pope

Personal details
- Born: Owen Edward John Walsh
- Spouse: Bianca Walsh
- Education: University of Tasmania
- Profession: Lawyer

Owen Edward John Walsh is a former Administrator of the Australian territory of Norfolk Island.

Son of John ("Jack") Melvyn Walsh (1923-1972) and Beverley Dawn Essen (1928-2011).

Walsh was educated at the Hutchins School, and then attended the University of Tasmania, from which he graduated with degrees in Arts and Law. He worked as a barrister and solicitor for the Supreme Court of the Australian Capital Territory, and as a senior policy adviser and legal officer for the Attorney-General's department, the Department of Transport and Regional Services, and the Australian Antarctic Division.

On Norfolk Island, Walsh was Official Secretary to the Administrator, Tony Messner, from 1999 to 2003, and again from January 2006 to Administrator Grant Tambling. When Tambling retired in 2007, Walsh was made Acting Administrator of the island on 7 August. He was sworn in as Administrator by the Governor-General Quentin Bryce on 2 October 2008. On 30 March 2012, Walsh stepped down as Administrator at the conclusion of his term, and was succeeded by Neil Pope. Walsh indicated he would resume his legal career in Canberra. Walsh became the in-house legal adviser for Food Standards Australia New Zealand.

Government offices
Preceded by Grant Tambling	Administrator of Norfolk Island; 2008–2012	Succeeded by Neil Pope
