= Electoral district of Wantirna =

Former state electoral district in Victoria, Australia

Coordinates: 37°51′S 145°14′E

Wantirna Victoria—Legislative Assembly
- State: Victoria
- Created: 1976
- Abolished: 2002
- Namesake: Suburb of Wantirna
- Demographic: Metropolitan

The Electoral district of Wantirna was an electoral district of the Victorian Legislative Assembly. It was first created after the Electoral district of Scoresby was abolished in 1976. Geoff Hayes was the last member for Scoresby in its first incarnation, and the first for Wantirna. After the 2002 redistribution, the electorate was replaced, once again returning as the Electoral district of Scoresby. The last member of Wantirna, Kim Wells was also the first member for Scoresby, in its second incarnation.

== Members for Wantirna ==
Member	Party	Term
Geoff Hayes	Liberal	1976–1982
Don Saltmarsh	Liberal	1982–1985
Carolyn Hirsh	Labor	1985–1992
Kim Wells	Liberal	1992–2002

== See also ==
- Parliaments of the Australian states and territories
- List of members of the Victorian Legislative Assembly
