= John Myles (Australian politician) =

Australian politician

John Myles (21 June 1813 – 12 July 1893) was a politician in colonial Victoria (Australia), a member of the Victorian Legislative Council and later, the Victorian Legislative Assembly.

Myles was born in Limerick, Ireland. With his brother, George Myles, he moved to Sydney in 1839. Henry Parfitt, M.L.A., was a passenger in the same vessel. After staying a few months in Sydney, the two brothers went to New Zealand, and settled at Kororareka – a town on the Bay of Islands, and one of the earliest British settlements in New Zealand. They soon moved to what was then known as the Port Phillip District of New South Wales. After a short stay in Melbourne they finally decided to settle down at Geelong. They built a store, and commenced business in Corio street, which was then the principal business street of the little town. After several years, as the town extended, they built new premises at the corner of Moorabool and Ryrie streets, known for many years after as Myles's corner. Then the rush to the gold diggings at Ballarat took place, and Geelong was deserted by nearly all its male population The two brothers went too, but were unsuccessful. John Myles sold out his business, and invested his means in the building of a number of shops and houses in Geelong. He took an active part in the early constitutional struggles, and in every movement for the advancement of the colony and of the district in which he lived.

Myles was a member of the Victorian Legislative Council for Grant from December 1852 until the original Council was abolished in March 1856. Myles was a member of the Victorian Legislative Assembly for the Electoral district of South Grant from November 1856 to July 1861.

Myles died in Durham Ox, Victoria on 12 July 1893.

Victorian Legislative Council
Preceded by John Mercer	Member for Grant; December 1852 – March 1856; With: William Haines 1853–54; Horatio Wills 1855–56	Original Council abolished
Victorian Legislative Assembly
New title	Member for South Grant; November 1856 – July 1861; With: William Haines 1856–58; John Bell 1859; Peter Lalor 1859–61; Horatio Wills 1856–59; James Carr 1859–61	Succeeded by William McCann; Michael Cummins
