= Daniela De Martino =

Australian politician

Member of the Victorian Legislative Assembly for Monbulk
- Incumbent
- Assumed office 26 November 2022
- Preceded by: James Merlino
- Majority: Labor

Personal details
- Political party: Labor

Daniela De Martino (Italian: [daˈnjeːla de marˈtiːno]) is an Australian politician who is the current member for the district of Monbulk in the Victorian Legislative Assembly. She is a member of the Labor Party and was elected in the 2022 state election, replacing retiring MLA James Merlino, achieving a 1.3% swing in her favour.

De Martino is the daughter and granddaughter of Italian immigrants. She has worked as a secondary teacher and has operated her own small business.
