= William Haines (Australian politician) =

Australian politician (1810–1866)

William Clark Haines
- Haines in 1858

1st Premier of Victoria
- In office 28 November 1855 – 11 March 1857
- Constituency: Nominee/ South Grant
- Preceded by: -
- Succeeded by: John O'Shanassy
- In office 29 April 1857 – 10 March 1858
- Preceded by: John O'Shanassy
- Succeeded by: John O'Shanassy

Personal details
- Born: 10 January 1810 Hampstead, London, UK
- Died: 3 February 1866 (aged 56) South Yarra, Melbourne, Victoria
- Spouse: Mary Dugard

William Clark Haines (10 January 1810 – 3 February 1866) was an Australian colonial politician who served as the first Premier of Victoria.

== Early life ==
Haines was born on 10 January 1810 in Hampstead, London, England. He was the son of Jane (née Bliss) and John Haines, his father being a physician.

Haines attended Charterhouse School and went on to Caius College, Cambridge, graduating Bachelor of Arts in 1833. He won a prize in mathematics. He went on to study medicine and practised in England as a surgeon.

Haines immigrated to Australia in the early 1840s, taking up land in the Port Phillip District (then part of the colony of New South Wales). In 1842 he became part-owner of a property near Geelong with John Highett, a member of a prominent Van Diemen's Land family and brother of William Highett. Their partnership was dissolved in 1846. In 1850, Haines subdivided his landholding of 2,849 acres (1,153 ha) between Pollocksford and Moriac. He was a territorial magistrate, a district trustee of the Port Phillip Savings Bank.

== Politics ==
=== Under representative government ===
On 11 November 1851, Haines was appointed to the newly constituted Victorian Legislative Council. He was one of the nominees of Lieutenant-Governor Charles La Trobe, at a time when only two-thirds of the council's members were directly elected. He resigned his seat the following year in protest at the government's moves to grant leases to illegal squatters. This action made him popular among smallholders and radicals, despite his otherwise conservative stances.

Haines was elected to the seat of Grant at the 1853 election. He served on the committee which drafted the Victorian constitution. Haines was appointed colonial secretary of Victoria on 12 December 1854. He succeeded John Foster, who had resigned at the request of Governor Charles Hotham following the Eureka rebellion.

=== Premier of Victoria ===
Photograph by Thomas Foster Chuck

Haines was appointed chief secretary of Victoria on 28 November 1855. Although the Victoria Constitution Act 1855 granted responsible government with immediate effect, the first elections for the newly created Victorian Legislative Assembly were not held until September 1856. During this time the government was responsible to the existing Legislative Council, with Haines being the leader of the government and being titled premier or prime minister.

Haines served until 11 March 1857. He was elected to the Legislative Assembly for South Grant in November 1856. Haines was again premier from April 1857 to March 1858.

=== Final years ===
Haines then visited Europe for three years. In 1860 he moved to the seat of Portland which he represented until 1864. Haines served as treasurer from 14 November 1861 to 27 June 1863, in the third O'Shanassy government. He served again in the legislative council, representing Eastern Province, from August 1865 until his death in February 1866.

== Personal life ==
In 1835, Haines married Mary Ann Dugard. He died in his home in South Yarra on 3 February 1866, from the effects of a carbuncle. He was survived by five sons and two daughters.

Haines was involved in the administration of cricket and horse racing, including as a trustee of the Melbourne Cricket Ground from 1861. He was a member of the Melbourne Club and a grandmaster in the Scottish Rite of Freemasonry.

== Legacy ==
The historian Raymond Wright describes Haines as a bluff, plain "honest farmer" type, who was "much enjoyed for his appalling public speaking." His main concern as premier was to democratise the Constitution which had been drawn up for Victoria by colonial officials before self-government, mainly to protect the interests of the squatter class. A bill was introduced to enlarge the Assembly, redraw electoral boundaries and abolish the property qualification for both votes and candidates. But the unstable situation in the Assembly brought his ministry to an early end.

== Further sources ==
- Geoff Browne, A Biographical Register of the Victorian Parliament, 1900-84, Government Printer, Melbourne, 1985
- Don Garden, Victoria: A History, Thomas Nelson, Melbourne, 1984
- Kathleen Thompson and Geoffrey Serle, A Biographical Register of the Victorian Parliament, 1856-1900, Australian National University Press, Canberra, 1972
- Waugh, John (2006). "Haines, O'Shanassy, Nicholson and Heales: The old guard, 1855-1863". In Costar, Brian J; Strangio, Paul (eds.). The Victorian Premiers, 1856–2006. Federation Press. ISBN 1-86287-601-0. Archived from the original on 9 October 2023.

Victorian Legislative Council
New creation	Nominated Member; 31 October 1851 – August 1852	Succeeded by Archibald Michie
New seat	Member for Grant; August 1853 – December 1854; With: John Myles	Succeeded by Horatio Wills
Preceded by John Foster	Nominated Member and Colonial Secretary; 12 December 1854 – March 1856	Original Council abolished
Political offices
New creation	Premier of Victoria; 30 November 1855 - March 1857 (First Term)	Succeeded by John O'Shanassy (First Term)
Preceded by John O'Shanassy (First Term)	Premier of Victoria; April 1857- March 1858 (Second Term)	Succeeded by John O'Shanassy (Second Term)
Victorian Legislative Assembly
New creation	Member for South Grant; November 1856 – November 1858; With: Horatio Wills; John Myles	Succeeded by John Bell
Preceded by Norman McLeod	Member for Portland; November 1860 – August 1864	Succeeded by John MacPherson
Victorian Legislative Council
Preceded by Matthew Hervey	Member for Eastern Province; April 1857– September 1880; With: Henry Murphy; William Highett; Robert Turnbull; Benjamin Williams	Succeeded by Robert S. H. Anderson
