= Steve McArthur =

Australian politician

Stephen James "Steve" McArthur (born 17 November 1951) is a former Australian politician. He was the Liberal member for Monbulk in the Victorian Legislative Assembly from 1992 to 2002.

McArthur was born in Mildura to Harold Alexander and Gloria McArthur. He graduated from Ballarat Church of England Grammar School in 1969, and became a farmer. On 7 November 1980 he married Sophie Wajsman. His son, Jacob Wajsman McArthur, was born 14 April 1982. In 1990 he began to be active in the Liberal Party, and in 1992 he was selected as the Liberal candidate for the state seat of Monbulk.

McArthur was elected to Monbulk, defeating Labor MP Neil Pope, and although he did not attain ministerial office during the Kennett Government, he was promoted to the front bench after Kennett's defeat in 1999 and became Shadow Minister for Water Resources and Manager of Opposition Business. In 2000 he was also given the Agriculture portfolio, but in 2002 he was defeated by James Merlino of the Australian Labor Party.

Parliament of Victoria
Preceded by Neil Pope	Member for Monbulk; 1992–2002	Succeeded by James Merlino
