= George Duncan Mercer =

Australian pastoralist (1814–1884)

George Duncan Mercer (27 December 1814 – 25 July 1884) was a landowner and pastoralist in colonial Victoria, Australia.

Mercer was born in India, the son of George Dempster Mercer and Frances Charlotte Reid. Mercer, with his cousin William Mercer, reached Hobart from Calcutta in March 1838, having sold out from the 45th Regiment Bengal Native Infantry. The Mercers established themselves as pastoralists in properties near Geelong.

His brother John later joined him in Australia.

In 1856 Mercer returned to Scotland, where he died unmarried in 1884.
