= James Merlino =

Australian politician

The Honourable James Merlino
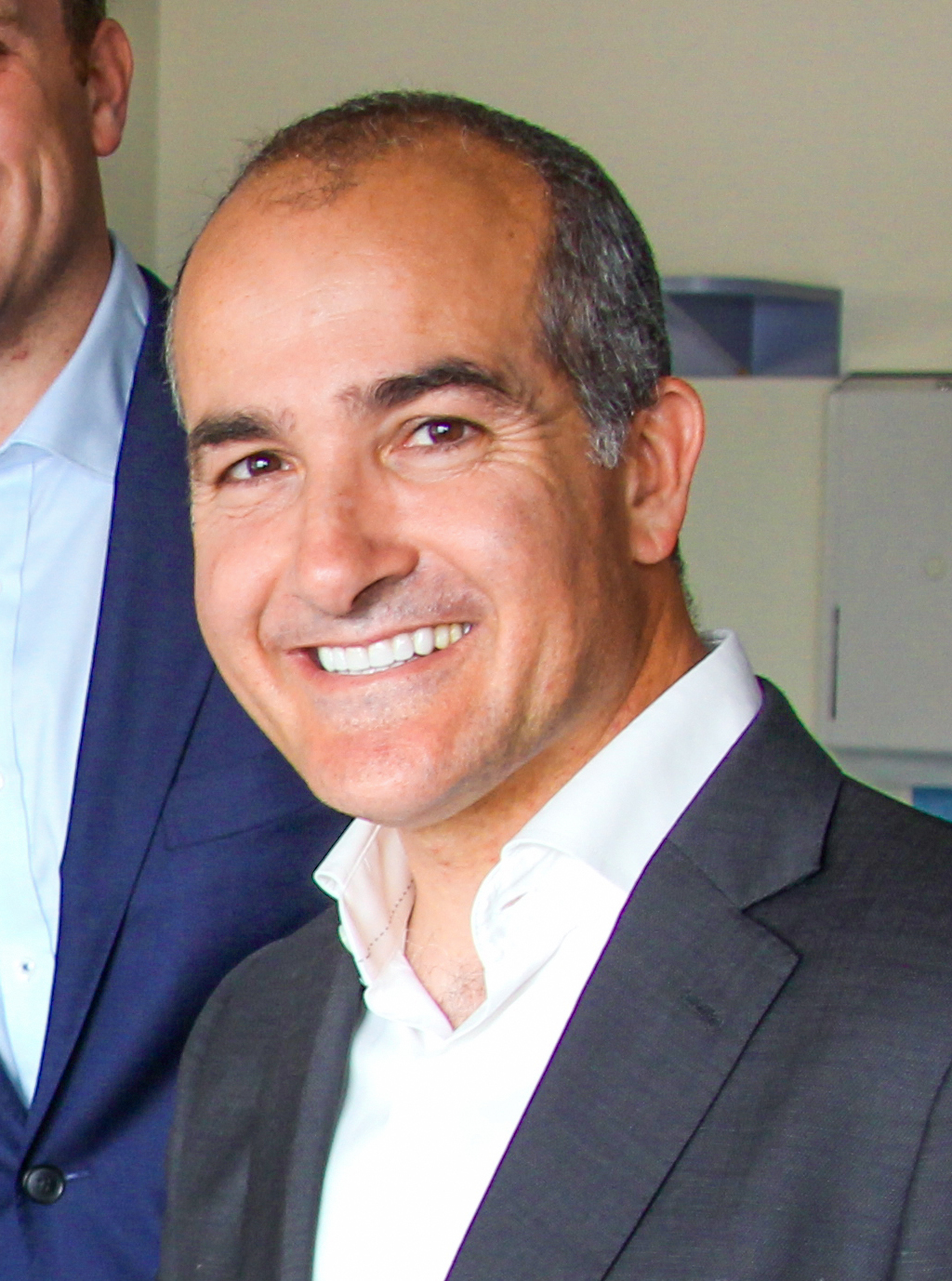
- Merlino with Jackson Taylor MP, 2021.

28th Deputy Premier of Victoria
- In office 4 December 2014 – 27 June 2022
- Premier: Daniel Andrews
- Preceded by: Peter Ryan
- Succeeded by: Jacinta Allan

Deputy Leader of the Labor Party in Victoria
- In office 2 February 2012 – 25 June 2022
- Leader: Daniel Andrews
- Preceded by: Rob Hulls
- Succeeded by: Jacinta Allan
Cabinet Positions
Minister for Education
In office 4 December 2014 – 27 June 2022
Premier	Daniel Andrews
Preceded by	Martin Dixon
Succeeded by	Natalie Hutchins
Minister for Mental Health
In office 29 September 2020 – 27 June 2022
Premier	Daniel Andrews
Preceded by	Martin Foley
Succeeded by	Gabrielle Williams
Minister for Emergency Services
In office 10 June 2016 – 29 November 2018
Premier	Daniel Andrews
Preceded by	Jane Garrett
Succeeded by	Lisa Neville
Minister for Police
In office 11 October 2010 – 2 December 2010
Premier	John Brumby
Preceded by	Bob Cameron
Succeeded by	Peter Ryan
Minister for Corrections
In office 11 October 2010 – 2 December 2010
Premier	John Brumby
Preceded by	Bob Cameron
Succeeded by	Andrew McIntosh
Minister for Sport, Recreation and Youth Affairs
In office 1 December 2006 – 2 December 2010
Premier	Steve Bracks; John Brumby
Preceded by	Justin Madden
Succeeded by	Hugh Delahunty

Member of the Victorian Legislative Assembly for Monbulk
- In office 30 November 2002 – 26 November 2022
- Preceded by: Steve McArthur
- Succeeded by: Daniela De Martino
other offices held
Chairman of the Suburban Rail Loop Authority
Incumbent
Assumed office 1 July 2023
Deputy Chair	Christine Wyatt (Note: from 1 December 2023 onwards, position of deputy chair was vacant from July to December)
Preceded by	James McKenzie
Chairman and Director of Retail Employees Superannuation Pty Limited
Incumbent
Assumed office 1 January 2023
CEO	Vicki Doyle
Preceded by	Kenneth Marshman
Chairman of Victorian Catholic Education Authority
Incumbent
Assumed office c. January 2024
Preceded by	Position established
Chairman of Slater & Gordon
Incumbent
Assumed office 16 December 2025
CEO	Dina Tutungi
Preceded by	James MacKenzie

Personal details
- Born: James Anthony Merlino; 17 August 1972 (age 54) Melbourne, Victoria, Australia
- Party: Labor
- Spouse: Meagan Merlino
- Children: 3
- Education: St Edmund's School; Mount Lilydale Mercy College
- Alma mater: University of Melbourne
- Occupation: Union official; Labourer; Politician

James Anthony Merlino (born 19 August 1972) is a former Australian politician who served as 28th deputy premier of Victoria from 2014 to 2022 under Premier Daniel Andrews. He was the deputy leader of the Victorian branch of the Australian Labor Party (ALP) from 2012 to 2022 and a member of the Victorian Legislative Assembly (MLA) for the division of Monbulk from 2002 until his retirement.

== Early life ==
Merlino was born in Melbourne to Italian immigrant parents Bruno and Mary Merlino. His father was a bricklayer who immigrated to Australia in 1961. Merlino attended St Edmund’s Primary School, where he became interested in politics especially during the 1984 Australian federal election.

== Political career ==
Merlino was elected at the 2002 state election defeating Steve McArthur. Merlino comfortably retained his seat at the state election in 2006 and became the Minister for Sport and Recreation and Youth Affairs, securing a place in cabinet. Under new Premier John Brumby's government he retained that ministry and gained a new role as Minister Assisting the Premier on Multicultural Affairs. He subsequently became Police Minister following the resignation of the previous Minister.

When the ALP lost government in the 2010 state election, Merlino became Shadow Minister for Police, the TAC and Road Safety. In February 2012, he was elected unopposed as Deputy Leader of the Labor Party in Victoria following the resignation of Rob Hulls, and subsequently became the deputy leader of the opposition.

With the election of the Andrews Labor Government in late 2014, Merlino became Deputy Premier and Education Minister. On 10 June 2016, Merlino also became Minister for Emergency Services following the resignation of Brunswick MP Jane Garrett from the Andrews Ministry.

In March 2021, Merlino became the Acting Premier of Victoria after Daniel Andrews fell down a flight of stairs while holidaying on the Mornington Peninsula, suffering several broken ribs and a broken vertebra from the fall. Merlino was Acting Premier until Andrews returned to work on 28 June 2021.

In June 2022, Merlino announced his retirement from politics and did not contest the November state election. He stepped down from his ministerial roles on 27 June 2022.

Merlino is a member of Labor's right faction. He is a Catholic.

== Football ==
In December 2022 he was part of the successful Andrew Gowers ticket in the Hawthorn board election.

== notes ==
Victorian Legislative Assembly
Preceded by Steve McArthur	Member for Monbulk; 2002–2022	Succeeded by Daniela De Martino
Political offices
Preceded by Peter Ryan	Deputy Premier of Victoria; 2014–2022	Succeeded by Jacinta Allan
Preceded by Martin Dixon	Minister for Education; 2014–2022	Succeeded by Natalie Hutchins
Preceded by Jane Garrett	Minister for Emergency Services; 2016–2018	Succeeded by Lisa Neville as Minister for Police and Emergency Services
Preceded by Martin Foley	Minister for Mental Health; 2020–2022	Succeeded by Gabrielle Williams
Party political offices
Preceded by Rob Hulls	Deputy Leader of the Labor Party in Victoria; 2012–2022	Succeeded by Jacinta Allan
