= Electoral district of Upper Yarra =

Former state electoral district of Victoria, Australia

Coordinates: 37.9019°S 145.3436°E

Upper Yarra Victoria—Legislative Assembly
- State: Victoria
- Created: 1927
- Abolished: 1945
- Namesake: Yarra River
- Demographic: Rural

The Electoral district of Upper Yarra was a Lower House electoral district of the Parliament of the Australian state of Victoria.

The district included (among others) the Dandenongs, Mulgrave, Baywater and Warburton, but was abolished in 1945.

== Members for Upper Yarra ==
Party	Member	Term
Nationalist	George Knox	1927 – 1945

After Upper Yarra was abolished, George Knox went on to represent the newly created Electoral district of Scoresby from 1945.
