= George Mercer (merchant) =

- Born: 21 July 1772; Kinwood, Perthshire, Scotland
- Died: 7 December 1853 (aged 81); Edinburgh, Scotland
- Spouse: Frances Charlotte Reid
- Children: 14, including; George Duncan; John Henry

George Mercer (1772-1853) was a Scottish merchant and landholder. He was a member of the Port Phillip Association, formed in June 1835 to settle land in what would become Melbourne, Victoria, Australia.

While he never visited Australia, his sons George and John and nephew William Mercer took up land near Geelong, before retiring to Scotland.
