= Electoral district of Scoresby =

Former state electoral district of Victoria, Australia

Scoresby Victoria—Legislative Assembly
- State: Victoria
- Dates current: 1945–1976, 2002–2014
- Electors: 39,121 (2010)
- Area: 45 km^{2} (17.4 sq mi)
- Demographic: Metropolitan

The Electoral district of Scoresby was an electoral district of the Victorian Legislative Assembly. It was first created after the district of Upper Yarra was abolished in 1945. George Knox was the last member for Upper Yarra and the first for Scoresby. The electorate was abolished after a redistribution in 1976, being replaced by the district of Wantirna. Geoff Hayes then became the first member for Wantirna-Jack Edwards then became the first member for wantrina. After the 2002 redistribution, the electorate was replaced, once again returning as the electoral district of Scoresby. The first member for Scoresby, Kim Wells, was also the last member for Wantirna. The seat was again abolished in 2014 and replaced by Rowville.

== Members for Scoresby ==
First incarnation (1945–1976)
Member	Party	Term
Sir George Knox	Liberal	1945–1960
Bill Borthwick	Liberal	1960–1967
Geoff Hayes	Liberal	1967–1976
Second incarnation (2002–2014)
Member	Party	Term
Kim Wells	Liberal	2002–2014

== Election results ==
2010 Victorian state election: Scoresby
Party	Candidate	Votes	%	±%
Liberal	Kim Wells	20,745	59.05	+5.93
Labor	Garry Nightingale	10,388	29.57	−2.82
Greens	Salore Craig	2,821	8.03	+1.52
Family First	Rachel Hanna	1,178	3.35	−3.42
Total formal votes		35,132	95.57	−0.36
Informal votes		1,627	4.43	+0.36
Turnout		36,759	93.96	−0.16
Two-party-preferred result
Liberal	Kim Wells	22,259	64.14	+2.97
Labor	Garry Nightingale	12,598	35.86	−2.97
Liberal hold		Swing	+2.97	

== See also ==
- Parliaments of the Australian states and territories
- List of members of the Victorian Legislative Assembly
