= Neil Pope =

Australian politician

The Honourable Neil Pope AM

Member of the Victorian Parliament for Monbulk
- In office April 1982 – 3 October 1992
- Preceded by: Bill Borthwick
- Succeeded by: Steve McArthur

Administrator of Norfolk Island
- In office 1 April 2012 – 1 July 2014
- Monarch: Elizabeth II
- Governors-General: Quentin Bryce; Sir Peter Cosgrove
- Preceded by: Owen Walsh
- Succeeded by: Gary Hardgrave

Personal details
- Born: 3 March 1949 (age 77) Melbourne, Victoria, Australia
- Party: Labor Party
- Spouse: Jennifer Mary Gebbie
- Children: 2
- Education: Swinburne Technical College; RMIT University
- Occupation: Politician

Neil Albert Pope AM (born 3 March 1949) is an Australian former politician. He was the Labor member for Monbulk in the Victorian Legislative Assembly from 1982 to 1992 and served as a Minister in the Labor Governments of John Cain II and Joan Kirner.

He was the Victorian Minister for Labour from 1988 to 1992, Minister for Youth Affairs from 1988 to 1991 and Minister for School Education from January to October in 1992. Pope lost his seat in October 1992, when the Kennett Liberal Government was elected.

Pope was appointed the 36th Administrator of Norfolk Island from 1 April 2012, initially for a two-year term. He completed this appointment on 30 June 2014.

On 1 December 2017, the Federal Attorney-General Senator George Brandis appointed Pope as a part-time member of the Administrative Appeals Tribunal for a period of 7 years.

== Early life ==
Pope was born in Melbourne. He was educated at Christ Church Grammar School, Caulfield Grammar School, Swinburne Institute of Technology (now Swinburne University) and the Royal Melbourne Institute of Technology (now RMIT University).

== Career ==
=== Before State politics ===
Between 1973 and 1976, Pope was an Assistant Accountant and Assistant Town Clerk in Victorian local government.

In 1976, he became an Industrial Officer with the Municipal Officers Association. From 1980 to 1982 he was an executive member of the Municipal Association of Victoria.

In 1979 until 1982, he served as a councillor on the Shire of Lillydale.

=== State politics ===
In April 1982, Pope was elected to the Parliament of Victoria in the electorate of Monbulk. He defeated Bill Borthwick who was Deputy Premier of Victoria at the time. Pope was re-elected in 1985 and 1988, but lost his seat in the Victorian election of October 1992.

Following the Victorian election of 1988, Pope was elected to the Victorian Cabinet. He was a Government Minister until the defeat of the Labor Government in 1992. He served as Minister for Labour (1988–1992), Minister for Youth Affairs (1988–1991) and Minister for School Education (1991–1992).

=== After State politics ===
In February 1993, Pope established Neil Pope and Associates, a human resource management consultancy, specialising in mediation and workplace reform. He also worked as an industrial relations adviser for Monash University.

From 2005 to 2012, he was chairman of the Forestry Industry Council of Victoria.

=== Appointment as Administrator of Norfolk Island ===
On 13 February 2012, the Minister for Regional Australia announced that Pope had been appointed the 36th Administrator of Norfolk Island.

Pope's term commenced on 1 April 2012 and was initially for two years. He was replaced by Gary Hardgrave on 1 July 2014.

== Honours ==
Pope was awarded a Centenary Medal in January 2001 for service to the community through industrial relations, local government and parliament.

In 2015, Pope was appointed a Member of the Order of Australia for "significant service to the community of Victoria, particularly through local and state government roles, and to the administration of Norfolk Island."

== See also ==
- List of Caulfield Grammar School people

Victorian Legislative Assembly
Preceded by Bill Borthwick	Member for Monbulk; 1982–1992	Succeeded by Steve McArthur
Political offices
Preceded by Barry Pullen	Minister for Education; 1992	Succeeded by Don Hayward
Government offices
Preceded by Owen Walsh	Administrator of Norfolk Island; 2012–2014	Succeeded by Gary Hardgrave
