= Electoral district of South Grant =

Colonial electoral district of Victoria (1856–1877)

Coordinates: 37°55′S 144°20′E

South Grant Victoria—Legislative Assembly
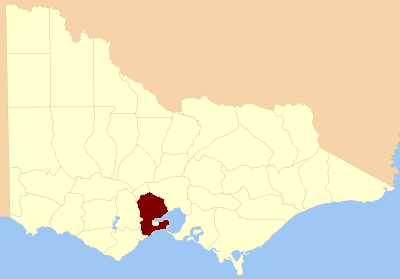
- Electoral district of South Grant, 1856
- State: Victoria
- Created: 1856
- Abolished: 1877
- Demographic: Rural

South Grant was an electoral district of the Legislative Assembly in the Australian state of Victoria from 1856 to 1877.

South Grant was based in the countryside surrounding (but not including) Geelong, bordered on the north and east by the Werribee River, on the west by the Yarrowee River and the coastline to current-day Anglesea.

The district of South Grant was one of the initial districts of the first Victorian Legislative Assembly, 1856.

== Members for South Grant ==
Three members were elected to the district.

Member 1	Member 2	Member 3	Term
William Haines	Horatio Wills	John Myles	Nov 1856 – Nov 1858
John Bell ^{#}	Horatio Wills	John Myles	Jan 1859 – Aug 1859
Peter Lalor	James Carr	John Myles	Oct 1859 – Jul 1861
Peter Lalor	Michael Cummins	William McCann ^{[s]}	Aug 1861 – Aug 1864
Peter Lalor	John Rout Hopkins	William McCann ^{[s]}	Nov 1864 – Aug 1867
Peter Lalor	John Rout Hopkins	William Stutt ^{#}	Sep 1867 – Dec 1867
Peter Lalor	George Cunningham	William Stutt ^{#}	Jan 1868 – Jan 1871
John Rout Hopkins	George Cunningham	Jonas Levien	Apr 1871 – Mar 1874
John Rout Hopkins	Peter Lalor	Jonas Levien	Mar 1874– Apr 1877

^{#} = won seat in by-election ^{s} = seat forfeited
