= George Hodges Knox =

Australian politician (1885–1960)

Brigadier Sir George Hodges Knox CMG, VD
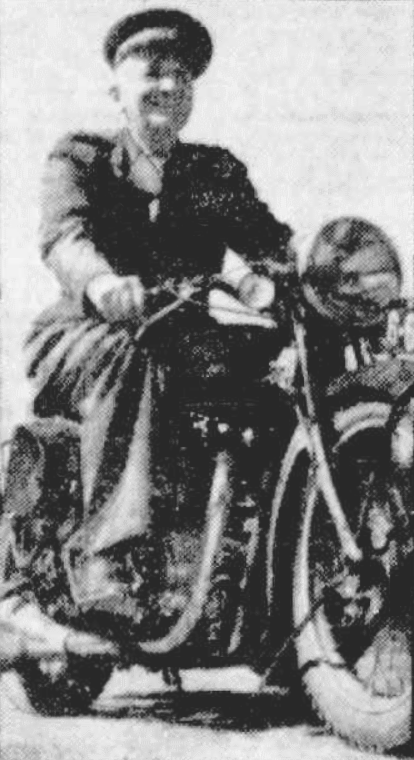
- Knox in 1940

Speaker of the Victorian Legislative Assembly
- In office 21 October 1942 – 9 October 1947
- Preceded by: Bill Slater
- Succeeded by: Sir Thomas Maltby

Member of the Victorian Legislative Assembly for Scoresby
- In office 10 November 1945 – 11 July 1960
- Preceded by: New division
- Succeeded by: Bill Borthwick

Member of the Victorian Legislative Assembly for Upper Yarra
- In office 9 April 1927 – October 1945
- Preceded by: New division
- Succeeded by: Division abolished

Personal details
- Born: 17 December 1885 Prahran, Victoria
- Died: 11 July 1960 (aged 74) Ferntree Gully, Victoria
- Party: Nationalist Party (1918–31); United Australia Party (1931–45); Liberal Party (1945–60)
- Spouses: Kathleen Purves MacPherson (m. 1909; div. 1919) Ada Victoria Harris (m. 1921)
- Parent: William Knox (father)
- Education: Scotch College, Melbourne
- Occupation: Engineer, soldier, orchardist, politician
- Civilian awards: Knight Bachelor

Military service
- Allegiance: Australia
- Branch/service: Australian Army
- Years of service: 1909–1942
- Rank: Brigadier
- Commands: Queenscliff-Nepean Covering Force (1942); 2nd Infantry Brigade (1940–42); 5th Battalion (1939–40); 52nd Battalion (1922–27); 48th Battalion (1921–22); No. 1 Command Depot (1916–18); 23rd Battalion (1915–16)
- Battles/wars: First World War; Gallipoli Campaign; Western Front; Second World War
- Military awards: Companion of the Order of St Michael and St George; Colonial Auxiliary Forces Officers' Decoration; Mentioned in Despatches (2)

Sir George Hodges Knox, CMG, VD (17 December 1885 – 11 July 1960) was an Australian politician, orchardist and military officer. The City of Knox is named after him.

Knox was born in the Melbourne suburb of Prahran on 17 December 1885 and educated at Scotch College, Melbourne. He was the son of William Knox, who had been a member of the Victorian Legislative Council between 1897 and 1901, and the member for Kooyong in the House of Representatives.

Knox began his working life as an electrical engineer. He married Kathleen Purves MacPherson in 1909. Soon after, he moved to Beaconsfield, Victoria, to establish an orchard. He joined the Citizen Military Forces in 1909 and served during the First World War, commanding the 23rd Battalion. He divorced in 1919. In 1920 he moved to Ferntree Gully, Victoria. He married Ada Victoria Harris in 1921. He was elected to the Fern Tree Gully Shire Council in 1923.

In 1927, Knox won the Victorian Legislative Assembly seat of Upper Yarra for the Nationalist Party. He became Speaker of the Victorian Legislative Assembly in 1942 and remained in that role until 1947. Between 1945 and 1960 he held the seat of Scoresby.

== Notes ==
Victorian Legislative Assembly
New division	Member for Scoresby; 1945–1960	Succeeded by Bill Borthwick
Preceded by William Slater	Speaker of the Victorian Legislative Assembly; 1942–1947	Succeeded by Sir Thomas Maltby
