= Electoral district of Rowville =

State electoral district of Victoria, Australia

Coordinates: 37.926°S 145.254°E

Rowville Victoria—Legislative Assembly
- Interactive map of electoral district boundaries from the 2022 state election
- State: Victoria
- Created: 2014
- MP: Kim Wells
- Party: Liberal
- Namesake: Rowville
- Electors: 39,893 (2018)
- Area: 62 km^{2} (23.9 sq mi)
- Demographic: Metropolitan

The electoral district of Rowville is an electoral district of the Victorian Legislative Assembly in Australia. It was created in the redistribution of electoral boundaries in 2013, and came into effect at the 2014 state election.

It largely covers the area of the abolished district of Scoresby, covering eastern suburbs of Melbourne. It includes the suburbs of Rowville, Lysterfield, Ferntree Gully, Scoresby, Wantirna South and Knoxfield.

The abolished seat of Scoresby was held by Liberal MP Kim Wells, who retained the new seat at the 2014 election.

== Members ==
Member	Party	Term
Kim Wells	Liberal	2014–present

== Election results ==
2022 Victorian state election: Rowville
Party	Candidate	Votes	%	±%
Liberal	Kim Wells	17,600	40.6	−10.3
Labor	Mannie Kaur Verma	14,283	32.9	−2.8
Independent	Nicole Seymour	5,231	12.1	+12.1
Greens	Angelica Di Camillo	3,055	7.0	−2.4
Family First	Stephen Burgess	1,433	3.3	+3.3
Freedom	Peterine Elizabeth Smulders	908	2.1	+2.1
Animal Justice	Diane Glenane	859	2.0	+2.0
Total formal votes		43,369	95.4	+1.3
Informal votes		2,070	4.6	−1.3
Turnout		45,439	91.4	−1.2
Two-party-preferred result
Liberal	Kim Wells	23,274	53.7	−1.8
Labor	Mannie Kaur Verma	20,095	46.3	+1.8
Liberal hold		Swing	−1.8	
