= Geoff Hayes =

Australian politician

Geoffrey Philip Hayes (19 January 1933 – 9 September 1994) was an Australian politician.

Hayes was born in Melbourne to advertising agent George Hayes and Elsie Irene, and attended school at Murrumbeena and Dandenong. He studied at Melbourne University part-time and became an advertising agent. On 1 September 1956 he married Margaret Lane, with whom he had three sons.

In 1967 Hayes was elected to the Victorian Legislative Assembly for Scoresby, transferring to Wantirna in 1976. From 1976 to 1978 he was Minister of Planning and of Housing. He retired in 1982 and subsequently worked as a marketing consultant. Hayes died in 1994.

Victorian Legislative Assembly
| Preceded by Bill Borthwick | Member for Scoresby; 1967–1976 | Abolished |
| New seat | Member for Wantirna; 1976–1982 | Succeeded by Don Saltmarsh |
