= Bill Borthwick =

Australian politician (1924–2001)

The Honourable Bill Borthwick AM
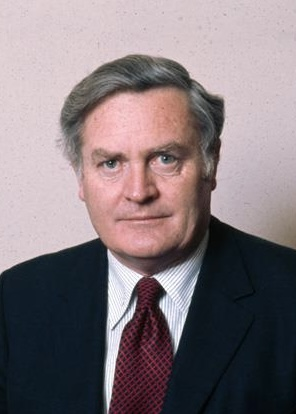
- Borthwick in 1974

20th Deputy Premier of Victoria
- In office 5 June 1981 – 8 April 1982
- Premier: Lindsay Thompson
- Preceded by: Lindsay Thompson
- Succeeded by: Robert Fordham

Member of the Victorian Legislative Assembly for Scoresby
- In office 17 September 1960 – 20 March 1967
- Preceded by: Sir George Knox
- Succeeded by: Geoff Hayes

Member of the Victorian Legislative Assembly for Monbulk
- In office 29 April 1967 – 24 February 1982
- Preceded by: District created
- Succeeded by: Neil Pope

Personal details
- Born: William Archibald Borthwick; 20 November 1924 Murrayville, Victoria, Australia
- Died: 31 July 2001 (aged 76) Geelong, Victoria, Australia
- Party: Liberal Party
- Other political affiliations: Liberal and Country Party
- Spouse(s): Dorothy Alice Hackett (m. 1948); Margaret Cameron Manders (m. 1971)
- Children: David, Mark and Andrew

Military service
- Allegiance: Australia
- Branch/service: Royal Australian Air Force
- Years of service: 1942–1945
- Rank: Warrant Officer

William Archibald Borthwick AM (20 November 1924 – 31 July 2001) was an Australian politician. Borthwick was a Liberal Party member of the Victorian Legislative Assembly for the electorates of Scoresby (1960–1967) and Monbulk (1967–1982).

== Early life and military service ==
Borthwick was born in Murrayville in north-western Victoria, and attended state schools in Cowangie and Walpeup before gaining a scholarship to study at Ballarat Grammar School between 1936 and 1939. From 1940 to 1957, he was a bank officer for the State Bank of Victoria, then worked as an insurance representative.

In December 1942, Borthwick enlisted in the Royal Australian Air Force. He served as a fighter pilot in England, Italy and Yugoslavia, and received a special award from the Yugoslavian government for his efforts in protecting Yugoslavia during World War II.

== Political career ==
Borthwick was elected to the Victorian Legislative Assembly in a September 1960 by-election for the seat of Scoresby triggered by the death of the sitting MP, Sir George Knox. At the 1967 state election, Borthwick switched to the new seat of Monbulk.

Bill Borthwick made a significant contribution to Victoria's environmental policies through the establishment of the Land Conservation Council in 1971 (now Victorian Environmental Assessment Council) which insulated controversial public land management recommendations from political interference.

== Honours ==
In the 1987 Queen's Birthday honours, Borthwick was made a Member of the Order of Australia (AM) in recognition of service to the Victorian parliament and to the community.

Victorian Legislative Assembly
Preceded by Sir George Knox	Member for Scoresby; 1960–1967	Succeeded by Geoff Hayes
District created	Member for Monbulk; 1967–1982	Succeeded by Neil Pope
Political offices
Preceded by Sir William McDonald	Minister of Water Supply; 1967–1970	Succeeded by Ian Smith
Preceded by Thomas Darcy	Minister of Lands; Minister of Soldier Settlement; Minister for Conservation; 1970–1979	Succeeded by Vasey Houghton
Preceded by Vasey Houghton	Minister of Health; 1979–1982	Succeeded by Tom Roper
Preceded by Lindsay Thompson	Deputy Premier of Victoria; 1981–1982	Succeeded by Robert Fordham
