= Kim Wells (Victorian politician) =

Australian politician

The Honourable Kim Wells MP
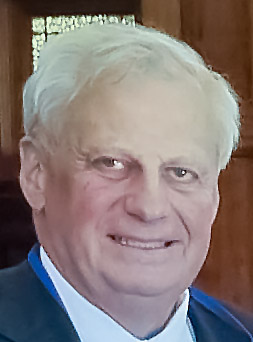

Treasurer of Victoria
- In office 2 December 2010 – 13 March 2013
- Premier: Ted Baillieu
- Preceded by: John Lenders
- Succeeded by: Michael O'Brien

Member of the Victorian Legislative Assembly for Rowville
- Incumbent
- Assumed office 29 November 2014
- Preceded by: Seat created

Member of the Victorian Legislative Assembly for Scoresby
- In office 30 November 2002 – 29 November 2014
- Preceded by: Seat recreated
- Succeeded by: Seat abolished

Member of the Victorian Legislative Assembly for Wantirna
- In office 3 October 1992 – 30 November 2002
- Preceded by: Carolyn Hirsh
- Succeeded by: Seat abolished

Personal details
- Born: 6 August 1958 (age 67) Leongatha, Victoria
- Party: Liberal
- Spouse: Judy Wells
- Website: kimwells.com.au

Kimberley Arthur Wells (born 6 August 1958) is an Australian politician. He has been a Liberal member of the Victorian Legislative Assembly since 1992, representing first Wantirna and then Scoresby and Rowville. Wells was the Treasurer of Victoria from December 2010 until March 2013. Wells was born in Leongatha, Victoria, and attended public schools in Bairnsdale, graduating in 1976. He is the current father of the Legislative Assembly and parliament of Victoria.

== Career ==
Wells received a Bachelor of Business, specialising in accounting, post-graduate Diploma of Business and a Master of Accounting from the Victoria University. He worked as an accountant from 1977, and joined the Liberal Party in 1984, holding various positions in the Wattle Park Branch.

Wells was selected as the Liberal candidate for Wantirna before the 1992 Victorian state election, and was elected. He held the seat until 2002, when it was replaced with safe Liberal Party seat of Scoresby, which Wells held. In 2000 he was appointed Shadow Minister for Corrections, Police and Emergency Services. He was the Shadow Treasurer from December 2006 to December 2010 and Treasurer of Victoria in the Baillieu Coalition Government from December 2010 to March 2013, when on Premier Ted Baillieu's resignation, Wells became Minister for Police and Emergency Services and Minister for Bushfire Response in the Napthine Coalition Government.

Wells’ division of Scoresby was abolished and effectively replaced by the new Division of Rowville for the 2014 Victorian Election, but remained a safe Liberal seat. Wells retained the seat at both the 2014 Victorian State Election and the 2018 Victorian state election.

In September 2021, Wells was dropped from the Shadow Ministry on the return of Matthew Guy to the Liberal Party leadership. Wells will retire from Parliament in 2026.

Political offices
Preceded by John Lenders	Treasurer of Victoria; 2010–2013	Succeeded by Michael O'Brien
Victorian Legislative Assembly
Preceded by Carolyn Hirsh	Member for Wantirna; 1992–2002	Abolished
New seat	Member for Scoresby; 2002–2014	Abolished
New seat	Member for Rowville; 2014–present	Incumbent
