= Dowling (surname) =

Dowling is an Irish surname. It is an anglicised form representing two unrelated clans:

1 – Ó Dúnlaing, noted as one of the seven septs of County Laois, the ancestral home called Fearann ua n-Dúnlaing (O'Dowling's Country). The Irish form of the name is Ní Dhúnlaing (unmarried female), Ó Dúnlaing (male) or [Bean] Uí Dhúnlaing (married female).

2 – Ó Dubhlainn, a minor family of County Galway, represented by Richard William Dowling (1838–1867), American Confederate officer.

According to historian C. Thomas Cairney, the O'Dowlings in Ireland were one of the chiefly families of the Loígis tribe who in turn came from the Cruthin tribe who were the first Celts to settle in Ireland from between 800 and 500 BC.

== List of people surnamed Dowling ==
- Alexandra Dowling (born 1990), English actress
- Ann Dowling (born 1952), British mechanical engineer
- Austin Dowling (1868–1930), American prelate of the Roman Catholic Church
- Bairbre Dowling (1953–2016), Irish actress
- Bartholomew Dowling (1823–1863) Irish poet
- Brian Dowling (disambiguation), multiple people, including:
  - Brian Dowling (presenter) (born 1978), Irish television presenter
  - Brian Dowling (American football) (born 1947), American football player
  - Brian Dowling (hurler) (born 1983), Irish hurler
- Bridget Dowling (1891–1969), Irish sister-in-law of Adolf Hitler
- Camila Vallejo Dowling, (born 1988), Chilean deputy congresswoman
- Catherine Dowling (born 1942), New Zealand broadcaster
- Constance Dowling (1920–1969), American model and actress
- Dan Dowling (1906–1993), American cartoonist
- Dereck Dowling (1914–2003), South African cricketer
- Dick Dowling (born 1938), Irish politician
- Eddie Dowling (1889–1976), American actor, director, and producer
- Edward J. Dowling (born 1875, date of death unknown), New York politician
- Garry Dowling, Australian rugby league footballer of the 1970s and 1980s
- George Dowling (born 1998), English footballer with Swindon Supermarine
- George Dowling (wool expert) (1854–1950), wool broker in South Australia
- Gerard Dowling (cricketer) (born 1964), Australian cricketer
- Graham Dowling (born 1937), New Zealand cricketer of the 1960s and 1970s
- Gregory Dowling (born 1956), English author, translator and literary critic
- Greg Dowling (born 1959), Australian rugby league footballer of the 1980s and 1990s
- Sir James Dowling (1787–1844), English-born Australian jurist
- Jane Dowling (1925–2023), British artist
- Jerry Dowling, American cartoonist
- Jim Dowling, Australian Catholic activist
- Joan Dowling (1928–1954), English character actress
- Joe Dowling (born 1948), American theater director
- John Dowling (disambiguation), multiple people
- Jonathan Dowling, Irish-American quantum physicist
- Joseph Dowling (1922–2014), Irish Fianna Fáil politician
- Kevin Dowling (disambiguation), multiple people, including:
  - Kevin Dowling (bishop) (born 1944), South African Roman Catholic bishop
  - Kevin Dowling (darts player) (born 1965), English darts player
  - Kevin Dowling (director), American film and television director and producer
- Lesley Rae Dowling, South African singer
- Levi H. Dowling (1844–1911), American preacher and author
- Mick Dowling (born 1946), Irish boxer
- Otto Dowling (1881–1946), American Navy captain and Governor of American Samoa
- Owen Dowling (1934–2008), Australian Anglican bishop
- Patrick Dowling (disambiguation), several people, including
  - Patrick J. Dowling (1939–2023), Irish engineer and educationalist
- Phil Dowling (born 1967), New Zealand curler
- Richard Dowling (disambiguation), multiple people, including:
  - Richard W. Dowling (1838–1867), Confederate officer in American Civil War
  - Richard Dowling (writer) (1846–1898), Irish novelist
- Robert W. Dowling (1895–1973), American real estate investor and philanthropist in the New York City area
- Roy Dowling (1901–1969), Australian naval admiral
- Seán Dowling (born 1978), Irish hurler
- Shane Dowling (born 1954), Australian politician
- Stephen Philip Dowling (born 1904?) English cartoonist - Garth, The Ruggles
- Terry Dowling (born 1947), Australian writer
- Tom Dowling (disambiguation), multiple people
- Vera Strodl Dowling (1918–2015), Danish pilot
- Victor J. Dowling (1866–1934), American judge and politician
- Vincent Dowling (1929–2013), Irish actor and director
- William Dowling (disambiguation), multiple people

== See also ==
- Irish clans
