= Electoral results for the district of Bellarine =

Victoria, Australia, district election results

This is a list of electoral results for the Electoral district of Bellarine in Victorian state elections.

== Members for Bellarine ==
First incarnation (1967–1976)
Member	Party	Term
Aurel Smith	Liberal	1967–1976
Second incarnation (1985–Present)
Graham Ernst	Labor	1985–1992
Garry Spry	Liberal	1992–2002
Lisa Neville	Labor	2002–2022
Alison Marchant	Labor	2022–present

== Election results ==
=== Elections in the 2020s ===
2022 Victorian state election: Bellarine
Party	Candidate	Votes	%	±%
Labor	Alison Marchant	20,103	42.63	−7.24
Liberal	Donnie Grigau	15,617	33.12	−2.37
Greens	Rachel Semmens	5,557	11.74	+2.75
Independent	Sarah Fenton	2,158	4.58	+4.58
Animal Justice	Adam Cardilini	1,088	2.31	−2.16
Family First	Guy Manuell	1,033	2.19	+2.19
Justice	Brett Anthony Ritchie	770	1.63	+1.63
Freedom	Kylee Muse	458	0.97	+0.97
Angry Victorians	Brendan Taylor	389	0.82	+0.82
Total formal votes		47,153	95.63	−0.43
Informal votes		2,156	4.37	+0.43
Turnout		49,308	89.62	–3.10
Two-party-preferred result
Labor	Alison Marchant	27,567	58.46	−2.99
Liberal	Donnie Grigau	19,586	41.54	+2.99
Labor hold		Swing	−2.99	

=== Elections in the 2010s ===
2018 Victorian state election: Bellarine
Party	Candidate	Votes	%	±%
Labor	Lisa Neville	21,948	49.87	+6.31
Liberal	Brian McKiterick	15,619	35.49	−5.12
Greens	Rachel Semmens	3,957	8.99	−0.43
Animal Justice	Naomi Adams	1,968	4.47	+4.47
Victorian Socialists	Jackie Kriz	521	1.18	+1.18
Total formal votes		44,013	96.06	+0.90
Informal votes		1,804	3.94	−0.90
Turnout		45,817	92.72	−2.66
Two-party-preferred result
Labor	Lisa Neville	27,049	61.45	+6.61
Liberal	Brian McKiterick	16,966	38.55	−6.61
Labor hold		Swing	+6.61	

2014 Victorian state election: Bellarine
Party	Candidate	Votes	%	±%
Labor	Lisa Neville	16,818	43.6	+6.1
Liberal	Ron Nelson	15,678	40.6	−6.0
Greens	Brenton Peake	3,639	9.4	+0.6
Sex Party	Rhiannon Hunter	631	1.6	+1.6
Family First	Robert Keenan	572	1.5	−0.5
Shooters and Fishers	Joshua Williams	490	1.3	+1.3
Country Alliance	John Irvine	436	1.1	−0.3
Rise Up Australia	Christopher Dawson	178	0.5	+0.5
Independent	Gus Kacinskas	169	0.4	+0.4
Total formal votes		38,611	95.2	−0.0
Informal votes		1,964	4.8	+0.0
Turnout		40,575	95.4	+5.8
Two-party-preferred result
Labor	Lisa Neville	21,174	54.8	+7.3
Liberal	Ron Nelson	17,437	45.2	−7.3
Labor notional gain from Liberal		Swing	+7.3	

2010 Victorian state election: Bellarine
Party	Candidate	Votes	%	±%
Liberal	Kurt Reiter	17,140	43.05	+5.85
Labor	Lisa Neville	16,324	41.00	−7.49
Greens	Judy Baldacchino	3,123	7.84	−1.75
Family First	Lara Duff	944	2.37	−2.34
Democratic Labor	Klaus Clapinski	831	2.09	+2.09
Country Alliance	Nick McCallum	665	1.67	+1.67
Independent	Stephen Juhasz	510	1.28	+1.28
Socialist Alliance	Mitch Cherry	274	0.69	+0.69
Total formal votes		39,811	94.69	−1.79
Informal votes		2,231	5.31	+1.79
Turnout		42,042	94.76	+0.59
Two-party-preferred result
Labor	Lisa Neville	20,449	51.37	−6.59
Liberal	Kurt Reiter	19,362	48.63	+6.59
Labor hold		Swing	−6.59	

=== Elections in the 2000s ===
2006 Victorian state election: Bellarine
Party	Candidate	Votes	%	±%
Labor	Lisa Neville	18,014	48.49	−1.26
Liberal	Don Gibson	13,821	37.20	−2.45
Greens	Justin Teague	3,564	9.59	−1.01
Family First	Len Lengyel	1,751	4.71	+4.71
Total formal votes		37,150	96.48	−1.24
Informal votes		1,354	3.52	+1.24
Turnout		38,504	94.17	−1.04
Two-party-preferred result
Labor	Lisa Neville	21,513	57.96	−0.25
Liberal	Don Gibson	15,604	42.04	+0.25
Labor hold		Swing	−0.25	

2002 Victorian state election: Bellarine
Party	Candidate	Votes	%	±%
Labor	Lisa Neville	17,861	49.8	+4.8
Liberal	Frank Kelloway	14,234	39.7	−9.4
Greens	Catherine Jones	3,804	10.6	+10.6
Total formal votes		35,899	97.7	−0.4
Informal votes		836	2.3	+0.4
Turnout		36,735	95.2	
Two-party-preferred result
Labor	Lisa Neville	20,911	58.2	+9.3
Liberal	Frank Kelloway	14,988	41.8	−9.3
Labor gain from Liberal		Swing	+9.3	

=== Elections in the 1990s ===
1999 Victorian state election: Bellarine
Party	Candidate	Votes	%	±%
Liberal	Garry Spry	15,875	49.5	−6.1
Labor	Kerri Erler	14,289	44.5	+0.1
Democrats	Erica Menheere-Thompson	1,930	6.0	+6.0
Total formal votes		32,094	98.2	−0.1
Informal votes		599	1.8	+0.1
Turnout		32,693	95.0	−0.8
Two-party-preferred result
Liberal	Garry Spry	16,599	51.7	−3.8
Labor	Kerri Erler	15,495	48.3	+3.8
Liberal hold		Swing	−3.8	

1996 Victorian state election: Bellarine
Party	Candidate	Votes	%	±%
Liberal	Garry Spry	16,974	55.5	−2.4
Labor	Elaine Carbines	13,586	44.5	+2.4
Total formal votes		30,560	98.3	+0.7
Informal votes		534	1.7	−0.7
Turnout		31,094	95.8	+1.5
Liberal hold		Swing	−2.4	

1992 Victorian state election: Bellarine
Party	Candidate	Votes	%	±%
Liberal	Garry Spry	14,333	50.1	+7.3
Labor	Graham Ernst	10,402	36.3	−7.8
Geelong Community	Malcolm Brough	2,651	9.3	+9.3
Independent	Gary MacNeill	1,241	4.3	+4.3
Total formal votes		28,627	97.6	−0.1
Informal votes		706	2.4	+0.1
Turnout		29,333	95.9	
Two-party-preferred result
Liberal	Garry Spry	16,533	57.9	+6.8
Labor	Graham Ernst	12,026	42.1	−6.8
Liberal hold		Swing	+6.8	

=== Elections in the 1980s ===
1988 Victorian state election: Bellarine
Party	Candidate	Votes	%	±%
Labor	Graham Ernst	13,865	46.07	−6.88
Liberal	Margaret Byrne	12,360	41.07	−5.98
National	John Foster	2,400	7.98	+7.98
Democrats	Laurie Levy	1,469	4.88	+4.88
Total formal votes		30,094	97.53	−0.62
Informal votes		763	2.47	+0.62
Turnout		30,857	93.51	−1.16
Two-party-preferred result
Labor	Graham Ernst	15,264	50.73	−2.22
Liberal	Margaret Byrne	14,822	49.27	+2.22
Labor hold		Swing	−2.22	

1985 Victorian state election: Bellarine
Party	Candidate	Votes	%	±%
Labor	Graham Ernst	14,738	53.0	+1.4
Liberal	Hugh McKenzie	13,098	47.0	+6.0
Total formal votes		27,836	98.1	
Informal votes		526	1.9	
Turnout		28,362	94.7	
Labor hold		Swing	−2.2	

=== Elections in the 1970s ===
1973 Victorian state election: Bellarine
Party	Candidate	Votes	%	±%
Liberal	Aurel Smith	15,095	50.9	+4.4
Labor	Royston Lawson	12,231	41.3	−0.3
Democratic Labor	Ray Evans	2,323	7.8	−4.1
Total formal votes		29,649	98.1	0.0
Informal votes		586	1.9	0.0
Turnout		30,235	94.4	−1.2
Two-party-preferred result
Liberal	Aurel Smith	17,070	57.6	+1.0
Labor	Royston Lawson	12,579	42.4	−1.0
Liberal hold		Swing	+1.0	

1970 Victorian state election: Bellarine
Party	Candidate	Votes	%	±%
Liberal	Aurel Smith	10,682	46.5	−4.1
Labor	Francis Brady	9,547	41.6	+4.5
Democratic Labor	James Crockett	2,740	11.9	−0.4
Total formal votes		22,969	98.1	+0.2
Informal votes		439	1.9	−0.2
Turnout		23,408	95.6	+0.9
Two-party-preferred result
Liberal	Aurel Smith	12,999	56.6	−3.5
Labor	Francis Brady	9,466	43.4	+3.5
Liberal hold		Swing	−3.5	

=== Elections in the 1960s ===
1967 Victorian state election: Bellarine
Party	Candidate	Votes	%	±%
Liberal	Aurel Smith	9,807	50.6	−6.0
Labor	Francis Brady	7,191	37.1	+4.8
Democratic Labor	James Crockett	2,392	12.3	+0.9
Total formal votes		19,390	97.9	
Informal votes		422	2.1	
Turnout		19,812	94.7	
Two-party-preferred result
Liberal	Aurel Smith	11,840	61.1	−5.0
Labor	Francis Brady	7,550	38.9	+5.0
Liberal hold		Swing	−5.0	
