= Electoral results for the district of South Barwon =

Victoria, Australia, district election results

This is a list of electoral results for the district of South Barwon in Victorian state elections.

== Members for South Barwon ==
Member	Party	Term
Aurel Smith	Liberal	1976–1982
Harley Dickinson	Liberal	1982–1992
Harley Dickinson	Independent	1992–1992
Alister Paterson	Liberal	1992–2002
Michael Crutchfield	Labor	2002–2010
Andrew Katos	Liberal	2010–2018
Darren Cheeseman	Labor	2018–2024
Darren Cheeseman	Independent Labor	2024–present

== Election results ==
=== Elections in the 2020s ===
==== 2022 ====
2022 Victorian state election: South Barwon
Party	Candidate	Votes	%	±%
Labor	Darren Cheeseman	19,969	44.2	+5.6
Liberal	Andrew Katos	14,516	32.1	−6.5
Greens	Genevieve Frances Dawson-Scott	5,719	12.6	+4.2
Family First	Alan Barron	1,338	3.0	+3.0
Democratic Labour	Leone Bates	1,099	2.4	−0.6
Animal Justice	Naomi Adams	1,076	2.4	−0.7
Justice	Jeynelle Marie Dean	891	2.0	+2.0
Freedom	Simone Tomlinson	576	1.3	+1.3
Total formal votes		45,184	96.5	+1.0
Informal votes		1,637	3.5	−1.0
Turnout		46,821	90.8	+1.9
Two-party-preferred result
Labor	Darren Cheeseman	27,020	59.8	+6.8
Liberal	Andrew Katos	18,164	40.2	−6.8
Labor hold		Swing	+6.8	

=== Elections in the 2010s ===
==== 2018 ====
2018 Victorian state election: South Barwon
Party	Candidate	Votes	%	±%
Liberal	Andrew Katos	18,180	37.61	−8.64
Labor	Darren Cheeseman	18,003	37.25	+3.86
Greens	Marian Smedley	4,164	8.62	−3.70
Independent	Damien Cole	3,699	7.65	+7.65
Animal Justice	Peter Oseckas	1,474	3.05	+1.14
Democratic Labour	Stephen Campbell	1,461	3.02	+1.87
Shooters, Fishers, Farmers	Robert Ripa	998	2.06	+2.06
Victorian Socialists	David Ball	355	0.73	+0.73
Total formal votes		48,334	95.50	−0.59
Informal votes		2,275	4.50	+0.59
Turnout		50,609	93.30	−1.60
Two-party-preferred result
Labor	Darren Cheeseman	26,389	54.60	+7.46
Liberal	Andrew Katos	21,945	45.40	−7.46
Labor gain from Liberal		Swing	+7.46	

==== 2014 ====
2014 Victorian state election: South Barwon
Party	Candidate	Votes	%	±%
Liberal	Andrew Katos	18,869	46.3	−1.2
Labor	Andy Richards	13,618	33.4	−2.1
Greens	Lisa Ashdowne	5,023	12.3	+3.2
Sex Party	Nick Wallis	806	2.0	+2.0
Animal Justice	Jamie Overend	778	1.9	+1.9
Family First	Steven Thompson	769	1.9	+0.0
Democratic Labour	Kevin Butler	472	1.2	+0.0
Country Alliance	Stephen Chara	459	1.1	−0.1
Total formal votes		40,794	96.1	+0.3
Informal votes		1,659	3.9	−0.3
Turnout		42,453	94.9	+4.2
Two-party-preferred result
Liberal	Andrew Katos	21,563	52.9	−2.0
Labor	Andy Richards	19,231	47.1	+2.0
Liberal hold		Swing	−2.0	

==== 2010 ====
2010 Victorian state election: South Barwon
Party	Candidate	Votes	%	±%
Liberal	Andrew Katos	20,133	45.93	+4.76
Labor	Michael Crutchfield	15,759	35.95	−7.99
Greens	Simon Northeast	4,208	9.60	+0.56
Independent	Heather Wellington	1,185	2.70	+2.70
Family First	Kathleen O'Connor	810	1.85	−2.81
Democratic Labor	Alan Barron	577	1.32	+1.32
Country Alliance	Tony Leen	547	1.25	+1.25
Independent	John Dobinson	323	0.74	+0.74
Independent	Keith Oakley	295	0.67	+0.67
Total formal votes		43,837	95.73	−1.20
Informal votes		1,955	4.27	+1.20
Turnout		45,792	94.79	+0.95
Two-party-preferred result
Liberal	Andrew Katos	23,675	53.94	+6.34
Labor	Michael Crutchfield	20,218	46.06	−6.34
Liberal gain from Labor		Swing	+6.34	

=== Elections in the 2000s ===
==== 2006 ====
2006 Victorian state election: South Barwon
Party	Candidate	Votes	%	±%
Labor	Michael Crutchfield	17,187	43.9	−3.5
Liberal	Michael King	16,103	41.2	+1.7
Greens	Matthew Walters	3,537	9.0	−0.3
Family First	Jonathan Tinney	1,821	4.7	+4.7
Independent	John Lambert	464	1.2	+1.2
Total formal votes		39,112	96.9	−0.2
Informal votes		1,239	3.1	+0.2
Turnout		40,351	93.8	
Two-party-preferred result
Labor	Michael Crutchfield	20,446	52.3	−2.7
Liberal	Michael King	18,666	47.7	+2.7
Labor hold		Swing	−2.7	

==== 2002 ====
2002 Victorian state election: South Barwon
Party	Candidate	Votes	%	±%
Labor	Michael Crutchfield	17,132	47.4	+10.0
Liberal	Alister Paterson	14,278	39.5	−11.2
Greens	Iain Lygo	3,372	9.3	+5.6
Independent	Andrew Hepner	1,212	3.4	+3.4
Independent	Eric Bullmore	147	0.4	+0.4
Total formal votes		36,141	97.1	−0.7
Informal votes		1,078	2.9	+0.7
Turnout		37,219	94.7	
Two-party-preferred result
Labor	Michael Crutchfield	19,880	55.0	+9.7
Liberal	Alister Paterson	16,261	45.0	−9.7
Labor gain from Liberal		Swing	+9.7	

=== Elections in the 1990s ===
==== 1999 ====
1999 Victorian state election: South Barwon
Party	Candidate	Votes	%	±%
Liberal	Alister Paterson	16,892	50.7	−8.4
Labor	Michael Crutchfield	12,468	37.4	−0.6
Democrats	Jeffrey Paull	1,891	5.7	+5.7
Greens	Stephen Chenery	1,233	3.7	+3.7
Independent	Tierry Lauren	598	1.8	+1.8
Independent	Michael Gannon	215	0.6	+0.6
Total formal votes		33,297	97.8	−0.4
Informal votes		761	2.2	+0.4
Turnout		34,058	94.3	
Two-party-preferred result
Liberal	Alister Paterson	18,222	54.7	−5.5
Labor	Michael Crutchfield	15,076	45.3	+5.5
Liberal hold		Swing	−5.5	

==== 1996 ====
1996 Victorian state election: South Barwon
Party	Candidate	Votes	%	±%
Liberal	Alister Paterson	18,565	59.2	+10.8
Labor	Michael Bjork-Billings	11,937	38.1	+9.0
Natural Law	Mark Toomey	868	2.8	+2.8
Total formal votes		31,370	98.2	+0.8
Informal votes		575	1.8	−0.8
Turnout		31,945	95.3	
Two-party-preferred result
Liberal	Alister Paterson	18,881	60.2	−0.6
Labor	Michael Bjork-Billings	12,473	39.8	+0.6
Liberal hold		Swing	−0.6	

==== 1992 ====
1992 Victorian state election: South Barwon
Party	Candidate	Votes	%	±%
Liberal	Alister Paterson	13,970	48.4	−2.9
Labor	Frances Patrick	8,392	29.1	−13.2
Independent	Harley Dickinson	3,589	12.4	+12.4
Geelong Community	Karan Dawson	2,035	7.0	+7.0
Call to Australia	Gary Lyons	886	3.1	−3.3
Total formal votes		28,872	97.4	−0.1
Informal votes		758	2.6	+0.1
Turnout		29,630	95.9	
Two-party-preferred result
Liberal	Alister Paterson	17,521	60.8	+6.7
Labor	Frances Patrick	11,280	39.2	−6.7
Liberal gain from Independent		Swing	N/A	

=== Elections in the 1980s ===
==== 1988 ====
1988 Victorian state election: South Barwon
Party	Candidate	Votes	%	±%
Liberal	Harley Dickinson	14,821	52.11	−1.29
Labor	George Williams	11,848	41.66	−4.94
Call to Australia	Terry Winter	1,774	6.24	+6.24
Total formal votes		28,443	97.63	−0.40
Informal votes		690	2.37	+0.40
Turnout		29,133	93.47	−2.35
Two-party-preferred result
Liberal	Harley Dickinson	15,590	54.82	+1.42
Labor	George Williams	12,848	45.18	−1.42
Liberal hold		Swing	+1.42	

==== 1985 ====
1985 Victorian state election: South Barwon
Party	Candidate	Votes	%	±%
Liberal	Harley Dickinson	14,218	53.4	+3.8
Labor	Harry Naylor	12,406	46.6	+2.8
Total formal votes		26,224	98.0	
Informal votes		535	2.0	
Turnout		27,159	95.8	
Liberal hold		Swing	+1.0	

==== 1982 ====
1982 Victorian state election: South Barwon
Party	Candidate	Votes	%	±%
Liberal	Harley Dickinson	14,536	49.2	−7.4
Labor	Eric Young	12,997	44.0	+0.6
Democrats	Kenneth Oliver	2,016	6.8	+6.8
Total formal votes		29,549	98.5	+0.6
Informal votes		452	1.5	−0.6
Turnout		30,001	94.3	−0.8
Two-party-preferred result
Liberal	Harley Dickinson	14,680	51.1	−5.5
Labor	Eric Young	14,055	48.9	+5.5
Liberal hold		Swing	−5.5	

=== Elections in the 1970s ===
==== 1979 ====
1979 Victorian state election: South Barwon
Party	Candidate	Votes	%	±%
Liberal	Aurel Smith	15,310	56.6	−2.0
Labor	Eric Young	11,728	43.4	+6.8
Total formal votes		27,038	97.9	−0.3
Informal votes		566	2.1	+0.3
Turnout		27,604	95.1	+0.6
Liberal hold		Swing	−6.4	

==== 1976 ====
1976 Victorian state election: South Barwon
Party	Candidate	Votes	%	±%
Liberal	Aurel Smith	14,093	58.6	+4.2
Labor	Raymond Hughan	8,786	36.6	−0.2
Democratic Labor	James Jordan	1,159	4.8	−1.7
Total formal votes		24,038	98.2	
Informal votes		434	1.8	
Turnout		24,472	94.5	
Two-party-preferred result
Liberal	Aurel Smith	15,136	63.0	+0.9
Labor	Raymond Hughan	8,902	37.0	−0.9
Liberal hold		Swing	+0.9	
