= Electoral results for the district of Geelong East =

Australian district election results

This is a list of electoral results for the electoral district of Geelong East in Victorian state elections.

== Members for Geelong East ==
First incarnation (1859–1877, 2 members)
Member 1	Term	Member 2	Term
James Cowie	1859 – 1860	Alexander Thomson	1859 – 1861
Augustus Greeves	1860^{[b]} – 1861	Alexander Thomson	1859 – 1861
Butler Cole Aspinall	1861 – 1864	John Richardson	1861 – 1876
George Cunningham	1864 – 1867	John Richardson	1861 – 1876
Charles Kernot	1868 – 1871	John Richardson	1861 – 1876
John Masters Garratt	1871 – 1877	Charles Kernot	1876^{[b]} – 1877

Kernot went on to represent the re-created Geelong from 1877.

Second incarnation (1976–1985)
Member	Party	Term
Phil Gude	Liberal	1976–1979
Graham Ernst	Labor	1979–1985

== Election results ==
=== Elections in the 1980s ===
1982 Victorian state election: Geelong East
Party	Candidate	Votes	%	±%
Labor	Graham Ernst	13,726	53.6	+5.9
Liberal	Raymond Carey	9,977	39.0	−5.6
Democrats	Robert Mann	1,059	4.1	−0.6
Democratic Labor	James Jordan	855	3.3	+0.2
Total formal votes		25,617	97.9	0.0
Informal votes		561	2.1	0.0
Turnout		26,178	94.0	−0.5
Two-party-preferred result
Labor	Graham Ernst	14,421	56.3	+4.6
Liberal	Raymond Carey	11,196	43.7	−4.6
Labor hold		Swing	+4.6	

=== Elections in the 1970s ===
1979 Victorian state election: Geelong East
Party	Candidate	Votes	%	±%
Labor	Graham Ernst	11,713	47.7	−0.8
Liberal	Phil Gude	10,953	44.6	−6.9
Democrats	Reginald Swetten	1,153	4.7	+4.7
Democratic Labor	Roderick Jordan	752	3.1	+3.1
Total formal votes		24,571	97.9	+0.9
Informal votes		534	2.1	−0.9
Turnout		25,105	94.5	+0.7
Two-party-preferred result
Labor	Graham Ernst	12,702	51.7	+3.2
Liberal	Phil Gude	11,869	48.3	−3.2
Labor gain from Liberal		Swing	+3.2	

1976 Victorian state election: Geelong East
Party	Candidate	Votes	%	±%
Liberal	Phil Gude	11,637	51.5	+6.6
Labor	Dennis O'Brien	10,971	48.5	+3.1
Total formal votes		22,608	97.0	
Informal votes		691	3.0	
Turnout		23,299	93.8	
Liberal hold		Swing	−1.4	
