= Charles Read (Australian politician) =

Australian politician

Charles Read (c. 1825 – 3 March 1910) was a tailor and politician in colonial Australia, a member of the Victorian Legislative Assembly.

Read was born in Southampton, England, the son of James Read and Ann, nee Lye. Read arrived in Geelong in October 1849 aboard the Tasman and started business as a tailor. He was involved in the Temperance Society, "with a striking personality, a vigorous platform speaker, he soon began to render splendid service to the organisation". Read was elected as one of the three representatives for Geelong in the Victorian Legislative Assembly in 1856. Read finished third in the field of seven. He was deputy registrar of births etc. at Geelong from 1870 to 1884.

Victorian Legislative Assembly
New creation	Member for Geelong; November 1856 – February 1858; With: Charles Sladen 1856–57; Alexander Fyfe 1856–57; John Brooke 1856–58; Alexander Thomson 1857–58; George Board 1858	Succeeded by James Harrison
