= Alexander Fyfe =

Australian politician (1826–1903)

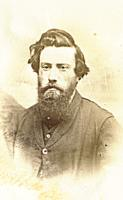

Member of the Victorian Legislative Council for Geelong
- In office June 1854 – March 1856

Member of the Victorian Legislative Assembly for Geelong
- In office November 1856 – November 1857
- Preceded by: New seat
- Succeeded by: George Board

Member of the Queensland Legislative Assembly for Rockhampton
- In office 20 June 1870 – 24 November 1873
- Preceded by: Henry Milford
- Succeeded by: Charles Buzacott

Personal details
- Born: Alexander Fyfe; 1826 Scotland
- Died: 1903 (aged 75–76) Preston, Victoria, Australia
- Resting place: Coburg Cemetery
- Occupation: Pastoralist, Ironmonger's assistant

Alexander Fyfe (1826 – 2 May 1903) was a Scottish-born settler of Victoria, Australia, who became a member of the Victorian Legislative Assembly, Victorian Legislative Council and the Queensland Legislative Assembly.

== Early life ==
Fyfe was born in Scotland. Fyfe emigrated to Australia, arriving in Melbourne in January 1848 aboard the Stag and settled in Geelong. He married Jane Nicholson Bailliff in 1854.

In Geelong, he was involved in the establishment of the:

- first building society
- the first bathing house
- the Geelong Chamber of Commerce
- the fire brigade
- a newspaper
- the Mechanic's Institute
- the first regatta (he owned four full-rigged vessels and chartered eleven more)

He was president of the:

- Mechanic's Institute
- the first cricket club in Victoria
- Geelong Agricultural Society

and a director/trustee of:

- the Geelong Botanic Gardens
- the Flinders State School
- the Geelong-Melbourne railway

and captain of the first volunteer regiment.

Alexander Fyfe was one of the first gold diggers at Ballarat. He was secretary of the Anti-Gold License Committee and contributed to legal expenses of the trial of Peter Lalor, the leader of the Eureka Rebellion

== Politics ==
Fyfe was elected to the Victorian Legislative Council for Geelong in June 1854, a position he held until the original Council was abolished in 1856.

Fyfe was elected to the inaugural Victorian Legislative Assembly as one of the four members for Geelong in November 1856, a seat he held until resigning in November 1857 due to insolvency.

Fyfe moved to Queensland where he purchased a pastoral property from P. F. MacDonald near Peak Downs and became a pastoralist and auctioneer. He represented Rockhampton in the Queensland Legislative Assembly from 20 June 1870 to 24 November 1873.

== Latter life ==
Fyfe returned to Melbourne around 1873 and died in Preston, Victoria on 2 May 1903.

Victorian Legislative Council
Preceded by James Cowie	Member for Geelong; June 1854 – March 1856; With: Alexander Thomson 1854; James Harrison 1854–1856, James Strachan 1854–1856	Original Council abolished
Victorian Legislative Assembly
New district	Member for Geelong; November 1856 – November 1857; With: Charles Sladen; Charles Read; John Brooke	Succeeded by George Board
Parliament of Queensland
Preceded by Henry Milford	Member for Rockhampton; 20 June 1870 – 24 November 1873	Succeeded by Charles Buzacott
