= Mayor of Greater Geelong =

Head of the Greater Geelong local government

- Incumbent; Stretch Kontelj since 2024
- Style: The Right Worshipful the Mayor of Greater Geelong
- Member of: Greater Geelong Council
- Seat: Geelong Town Hall
- Appointer: Greater Geelong Council
- Inaugural holder: Foster Fyans (Town of Geelong); Gerry Smith (Greater Geelong)
- Formation: 1 October 1925; 100 years ago
- Website: www.geelongaustralia.com.au/councillors/default.aspx

The mayor of Greater Geelong heads the City of Greater Geelong, the second largest local government in Victoria, Australia. They are selected from among other councillors, elected every four years. Before amalgamation in 1993 the central area of Geelong was covered by the City of Geelong, with the surrounding suburbs falling into the Shire of Barrabool, Shire of Bannockburn, Rural City of Bellarine, Shire of Corio, City of Geelong West, City of Newtown, and City of South Barwon.

== List of mayors of Geelong ==
=== Town of Geelong (1849–1910) ===
#	Mayor	Term
1	Foster Fyans	1849–1850
2	Alexander Thomson	1850–1851
3	James Austin	1851–1852
4	James Cowie	1852–1853
5	Dr William Baylie	1853–1855
6	Alexander Thomson	1855–1858
7	William Burrow	1858–1860
8	William Bell	1860–1862
9	Edward Knight	1862–1863
10	Andrew Parker	1863–1864
11	Charles Kernot	1864–1865
12	Robert de Bruce Johnstone	1865–1868
13	Thomas Newnham Couves	1868–1870
14	William Francis Ducker	1870–1872
15	Robert Reeves	1872–1873
16	George Frederick Belcher	1873–1874
17	William Upton	1874–1875
18	George Frederick Belcher	1875–1876
19	John Garratt	1876–1878
20	Joseph Henry Connor	1878–1880
21	George Cunningham	1880–1883
22	John Longville Price	1883–1884
23	George Martin	1884–1885
24	William Newton Sommers	1885–1886
25	William Bell	1886–1887
26	Henry Meakin	1887–1888
27	William Humble	1888–1889
28	William Picken Carr	1889–1890
29	James Strong	1890–1891
30	Joseph Henry Connor	1891–1892
31	John Rout Hopkins	1892–1893
32	Joseph Grey	1893–1894
33	Horace Frank Richardson	1894–1896
34	Sidney Austin	1896–1899
35	William Picken Carr	1899–1901
36	Solomon Jacobs	1901–1902
37	Isaac Hodges	1902–1903
38	Neil Campbell	1903–1905
39	Thomas Edward Bostock	1905–1908
40	Walter Higgins	1908–1909
41	Herbert Arthur Austin	1909–1910

=== City of Geelong (1910–1993) ===
#	Mayor	Term
42	Edward Philpott	1910–1911
43	Robert Williams	1911–1912
44	William Robert Anderson	1912–1913
45	Edward George Gurr	1913–1914
46	William Brownbill	1914–1915
47	Arthur John Holden	1915–1916
48	George Frederick Taylor	1916–1917
49	Howard Hitchcock	1917–1922
50	Joseph Charles King	1922–1923
51	Robert Purnell	1923–1924
52	Francis Ritchie	1924–1925
53	Joseph Alexander Thear	1925–1926
54	Julius Solomon	1926–1927
55	Thomas Walls	1927–1928
56	Solomon Jacobs	1928–1930
57	Oswald Hearne	1930–1932
58	Edward Allan McDonald	1932–1935
59	Charles Naples Brown	1935–1938
60	Solomon Jacobs	1938–1939
61	Robert Charles Thear	1939–1942
62	Frederick Hilton Wallace	1942–1945
63	J. J. Young	1945–1948
64	Frank Evan Richardson	1948–1949
65	Bervin Ellis Purnell	1949–1952
66	Morris Jacobs	1952–1954
67	Sir Roy Fidge	1954–1956
68	Albert Leslie Backwell	1956–1959
69	Vautin Andrews	1959–1961
70	Ranald McAllister	1961–1964
71	Sir Roy Fidge	1964–1968
72	Oliver Wood	1968–1971
73	James Dowsett	1971–1973
74	Harold George Verrall	1973–1975
75	John Holt	1975–1977
76	Howard Glover	1977–1980
77	Des Podbury	1980–1982
78	Graham Bruce Adams	1982–1983
79	Ian Inglis	1983–1985
80	Hayden Spurling	1985–1987
81	Jim Fidge	1987–1989
82	Brian Fowler	1989–1991
83	Frank De Stefano	1991–1993

=== Commissioners (1993–1995) ===
Commissioners	Term
Bill Dix (Chairman)	1993–1995
Glyn Jenkins (Deputy Chairman)	1993–1995
Frank Wilkes	1993–1995
Toni McCormack	1993–1995

=== City of Greater Geelong (since 1993) ===
#	Mayor	Term
84	Gerry Smith	1995–1998
85	Ken Jarvis	1998–2000
86	Michael Crutchfield	2000–2001
87	Srečko Kontelj	2001–2002
88	Barbara Abley	2002–2004
89	Ed Coppe	2004
90	Shane Dowling	2004–2005
91	Peter McMullin	2005–2006
92	Bruce Harwood	2006–2008
93	John Mitchell	2008–2012
94	Keith Fagg	2012–2013
95	Bruce Harwood	2013 (acting)
96	Darryn Lyons	2013–2016
97	Bruce Harwood	2017–2019
98	Stephanie Asher	2019–2022
99	Peter Murrihy	2022–2022
100	Trent Sullivan	2022–2024
101	Stretch Kontelj	2024–Incumbent

=== Administrators (2016–2017) ===
Administrator	Term
Yehudi Blacher (interim administrator)	April–May 2016
Kathy Alexander (chairperson) (Note: The chairperson of the panel of administrators has the same functions, powers and duties as the mayor of the council.)	2016–2017
Peter Dorling	2016–2017
Laurinda Gardner	2016–2017

== See also ==
- Geelong, Victoria
- 2012 Geelong mayoral election
- 2013 Geelong mayoral election
