= James Harrison (engineer) =

Scottish Victorian politician and engineer (1816 – 1893)

- Born: 17 April 1816; Bonhill, Dunbartonshire, Scotland
- Died: 3 September 1893 (aged 77); Geelong, Victoria
- Occupations: Engineer and politician
- Known for: Refrigeration

James Harrison (17 April 1816 – 3 September 1893) was a Scottish Australian newspaper printer, journalist, politician, and pioneer in the field of mechanical refrigeration.

Harrison founded the Geelong Advertiser newspaper and was a member of the Victorian Legislative Council and Victorian Legislative Assembly. Harrison is also remembered as the inventor of the mechanical refrigeration process creating ice and founder of the Victorian Ice Works and as a result, is often called "the father of refrigeration". In 1873 he won a gold medal at the Melbourne Exhibition by proving that meat kept frozen for months remained perfectly edible.

== Early life ==
James Harrison was born at Bonhill, Dunbartonshire, the son of a fisherman. Harrison attended Anderson's University and then the Glasgow Mechanics' Institution, specialising in chemistry. He trained as a printing apprentice in Glasgow and worked in London as a compositor before emigrating to Sydney, Australia in 1837 to set up a printing press for the English company Tegg & Co. Moving to Melbourne in 1839 he found employment with John Pascoe Fawkner as a compositor and later editor on Fawkner's Port Phillip Patriot. When Fawkner acquired a new press, Harrison offered him 30 pounds for the original old press to start Geelong's first newspaper. The first weekly edition of the Geelong Advertiser appeared November 1840: edited by 'James Harrison and printed and published for John Pascoe Fawkner (sole proprietor) by William Watkins...'. By November 1842, Harrison became sole owner.

== Political career ==
Harrison was a member of Geelong's first town council in 1850 and represented Geelong in the Victorian Legislative Council from November 1854 until its abolition in March 1856. Harrison then represented Geelong 1858–59 and Geelong West 1859–60 in the Victorian Legislative Assembly.

As an editor he was an early advocate for tariff protection which later he brought to prominence when he was editor of The Age under the proprietorship of David Syme. But his rise ceased abruptly in 1854 after a controversial libel suit was brought against him by the Crown Prosecutor George Mackay whose evident drunkenness on duty Harrison had editorially deplored. The jury brought in a verdict for Mackay with Harrison to pay £800 damages. In 1862, although his assets were worth £22,000, he had to sell the Advertiser to escape bankruptcy.

It was while he owned this paper from 1842 to 1862 that his interest in refrigeration and ice-making began to develop. Whilst cleaning movable type with ether, he noticed that the evaporating fluid would leave the metal type cold to the touch.

== Ice-making operation and later life ==
Harrison's first mechanical ice-making machine began operation in 1851 on the banks of the Barwon River at Rocky Point in Geelong.

Because of the cost of importing ice from the United States and Norway for use in ice houses, Harrison's device became a financially viable alternative for the remote Victoria colony, and his first commercial ice-making machine followed in 1854, along with a patent for an ether refrigeration system granted in 1855. This novel system used a compressor to force the refrigeration gas to pass through a condenser, where it cooled down and liquefied. The liquefied gas then circulated through the refrigeration coils and vaporised again, cooling down the surrounding system. The machine employed a 5 m (16 ft.) flywheel and produced 3,000 kilograms (6,600 lb) of ice per day. In 1856 Harrison went to London where he patented both his process (747 of 1856) and his apparatus (2362 of 1857).

Also in 1856, James Harrison, was commissioned by a brewery to build a machine that could cool beer. His system was almost immediately taken up by the brewing industry and was also widely used by meatpacking factories.

Though Harrison had commercial success establishing a second ice company back in Sydney in 1860, he later entered the debate of how to compete against the American advantage of unrefrigerated beef sales to the United Kingdom. He wrote Fresh Meat frozen and packed as if for a voyage, so that the refrigerating process may be continued for any required period, and in 1873 prepared the sailing ship Norfolk for an experimental beef shipment to the United Kingdom. His choice of a cold room system instead of installing a refrigeration system upon the ship itself proved disastrous when the ice was consumed faster than expected. The experiment failed, ruining public confidence in refrigerated meat at that time. He returned to journalism, becoming editor of the Melbourne Age in 1867.

Harrison returned to Geelong in 1892 and died at his Point Henry home on 3 September 1893.

== Legacy ==
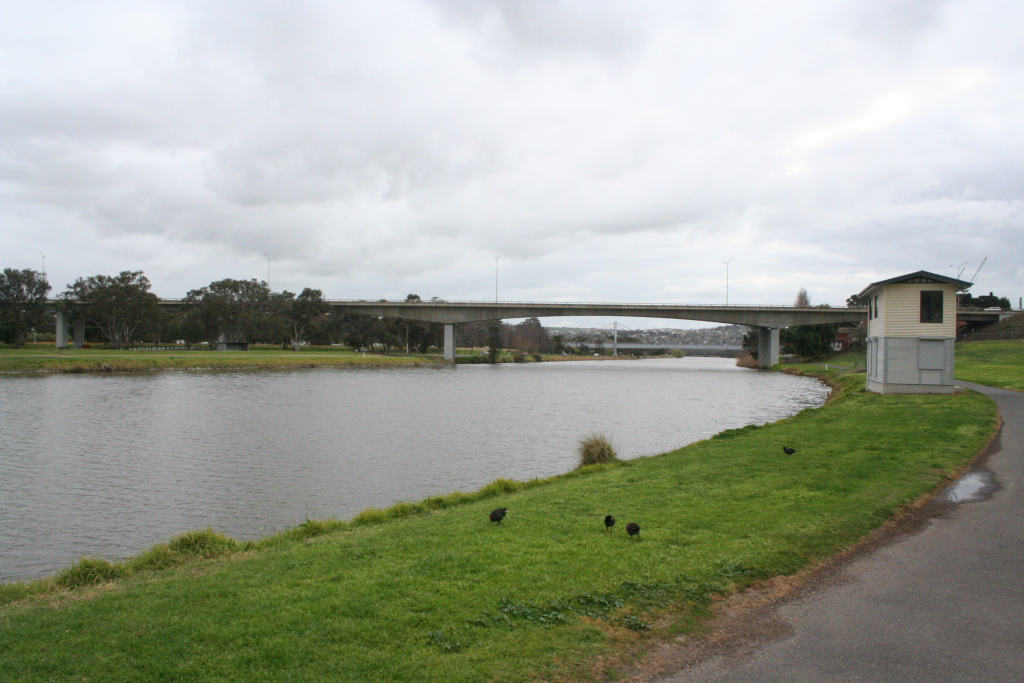
The James Harrison bridge over the River Barwon

The James Harrison Museum committee have acquired land at Rocky Point (the site of the first ice-making machine in the world) and are endeavouring to build a museum there.

The Australian Institute of Refrigeration Air Conditioning and Heating's most distinguished award is the James Harrison Medal.

The James Harrison bridge spanning the Barwon River in Geelong is named in his honour.

A plaque located at 100 Franklin St, Melbourne commemorates the Victoria Ice Works founded by James Harrison in 1859.

The centenary of refrigeration (1856-1956) was commemorated with a plaque in Ryrie Street, Geelong Advertiser Building.

== See also ==
- John Gorrie - American physician and inventor, another pioneer of refrigeration.
- Thomas Sutcliffe Mort - another Australian refrigeration pioneer, who financed the work of the engineer Eugene Dominic Nicolle.
- Jacob Perkins - American inventor who patented an ether cycle machine in 1836.
- Alexander Twining - an American contemporary who patented a similar machine in 1850 and 1853.

Victorian Legislative Council
Preceded by Alexander Thomson	Member for Geelong; November 1854 – March 1856; With: Alexander Fyfe; James Strachan	Original Council abolished
Victorian Legislative Assembly
Preceded by Charles Read	Member for Geelong; April 1858 – August 1859; With: Alexander Thomson; George Board; John Brooke	District abolished
New district	Member for Geelong West; October 1859 – September 1860; With: John Brooke	Succeeded by Nicholas Foott
