= Shane Dowling =

Australian politician

Shane Dowling (born 16 June 1954) is a former Australian politician. He was mayor of South Melbourne from 1989 to 1991 and mayor of Geelong from December 2004 to November 2005.

Dowling is a former police officer, rising to become an inspector in the Victoria Police. He was serving in Melton at the time of his election as Geelong mayor. He was elected to the City of Greater Geelong council in 2001, representing Deakin Ward, and was re-elected in 2004. He was elected mayor by the other councillors after the 2004 elections, following the failure of incumbent mayor Ed Coppe to hold his seat on the council. Dowling served a one-year term before relinquishing the position to former City of Melbourne councillor Peter McMullin.

Dowling resigned from the council mid-term in 2008, ten months before the regular elections, because he had moved to Melbourne. Local businessman and future state Liberal MP, Andrew Katos, was elected to fill the vacancy caused by Dowling's resignation.

Dowling contested the 2008 municipal elections for the City of Port Phillip, but was defeated by former Port Phillip mayor Janet Bolitho.
