= Alfred Brooke-Smith =

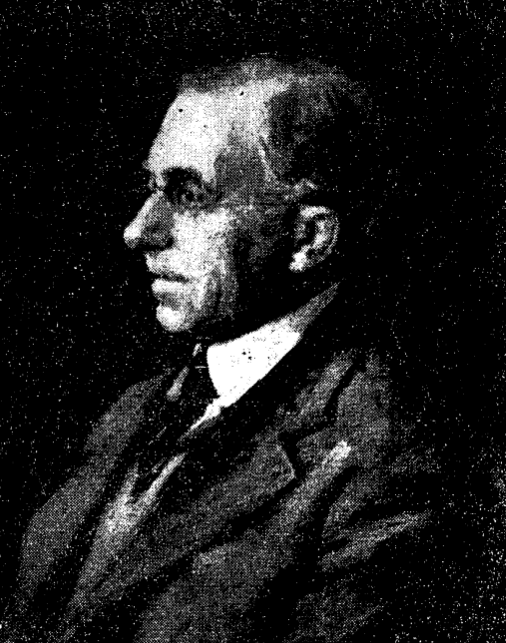

Chairman of the Shanghai Municipal Council
- In office 1920–1922
- Preceded by: Sir Edward Pearce
- Succeeded by: H.G. Simms

Personal details
- Born: November 3, 1874 England
- Died: April 6, 1938 (aged 65) Suffolk, England
- Profession: Businessman

Alfred Brooke-Smith (1874–1938) was the chairman of the Shanghai Municipal Council for two years from 1920 to 1922. He also served as managing director of Jardine Matheson & Co.

== Biography ==
Brooke-Smith was born on 3 November 1874 in Yokohama, Japan, and received his education there. His parents were William Henry Smith and Gertrude Brooke. His grandfather was John Henry Brooke, and his uncle was Edmund Walpole Brooke.

At the age of 16, he joined the firm of Findlay Richardson in Yokohama. In 1897, he joined Jardine Matheson & Co. as an assistant in their Import and Cotton Mill Department in Hong Kong. On 1 May 1918, he was appointed a director and was senior director at Shanghai from 1919 to 1926. He was also managing director in 1924-5.

He served on the Shanghai Municipal Council from 1917 and, in 1919, became vice-chairman. In 1920 he became chairman of the council and served in that position until 1922.

He retired in 1926 and returned to England.

He died on 6 April 1938 at Martley Hall, Suffolk, England.

== Marriage ==
Brooke-Smith married Ann Bigland Brand, daughter of Mr David Brand of Shanghai, in December 1918 at the Holy Trinity Cathedral, Shanghai.
