= Road show =

Road show, Roadshow, or Road Show may refer to:

- Road Show (album), a 1960 album by the Stan Kenton Orchestra with June Christy and The Four Freshmen
- Road Show (film), a 1941 film
- Road Show (musical), a musical by Stephen Sondheim and John Weidman
- The Road Show, a 1977 Canadian television series
- RoadShow, a media company in Hong Kong
- Roadshow theatrical release, a practice in which a film opened in a limited number of theaters in large cities
- Antiques Roadshow, a BBC TV series where antiques specialist travel around the country to appraise objects
- Radio 1 Roadshow, a former summer event in the UK (1973-1999)
- Red & Ted's Road Show, a 1994 pinball machine commonly referred to as Road Show.

== See also ==
- Financial roadshows
- Travelling exhibition
