= John Dowling =

John Dowling may refer to:

== Sports ==
- John Dowling (Australian rules footballer) (1909–1967), Australian rules footballer for North Melbourne and Footscray
- John Dowling (footballer, born 1944), Australian rules footballer for St Kilda
- John Dowling (Gaelic footballer) (1930–1998), Irish Gaelic footballer
- John Dowling (rugby league) (born 1953), Australian former rugby league footballer
- John Dowling (sports administrator) (1931–2002), Irish Gaelic games administrator

== Other people ==
- John Dowling (musician) (born 1981), British banjo player
- John Dowling (pastor) (1807–1878), American pastor and author
- John Dowling (RAF officer) (1923–2000), British helicopter pilot
- John Francis Dowling (1851–1926), Ontario physician and political figure
- John E. Dowling (born before 1961), American neuroscientist
- John Lawrence Dowling, Canadian politician
- John Dowling, deputy Supreme Knight of the Knights of Columbus
- John Dowling, professor at Ecole de Management Léonard De Vinci

== See also ==
- John Dowling Coates, Australian businessman and Olympic committee member
- Jonathan Dowling (1955–2020), physicist
