= Stretch Kontelj =

Australian politician

Stretch Kontelj OAM

87th & 101st Mayor of Geelong
- Incumbent
- Assumed office 2024
- Deputy: Ron Nelson
- Preceded by: Trent Sullivan
- In office 2001–2002
- Preceded by: Michael Crutchfield
- Succeeded by: Barbara Abley

City of Greater Geelong Councillor for Kardinia Ward
- Incumbent
- Assumed office 2024
- Preceded by: Ward Established

City of Greater Geelong Councillor for Kildare Ward
- In office 1998 – 31 July 2015

Personal details
- Born: Srechko Jernej Kontelj; 1961 (age 64–65) Geelong, Victoria, Australia
- Party: Liberal Party

Srechko Jernej "Stretch" Kontelj, OAM (born 1961) is an Australian lawyer and politician currently serving as the Mayor of the City of Greater Geelong, representing Kardinia Ward. Prior to taking office, Kontelj had served as a councillor for the city, representing Kildare Ward from 1998 to 2015, as Mayor of Geelong from 2001 to 2002 and as Deputy Mayor from 2012 to 2013.

== Early life, education and legal career ==
Kontelj was born in Geelong, the son of newly arrived migrants from Slovenia.

He holds degrees in law, economics, accounting, commerce, business administration, applied corporate governance, arts, notarial practice and military law from the Universities of Monash, Melbourne, Victoria, Deakin and King's College London. In 1999 he was awarded Deakin University Law School's first Doctorate in Juridical Science.

In 2011, Kontelj was appointed a Notary Public servicing the greater Geelong region.

Between 2008 and 2015, Kontelj was employed as an in-house lawyer by the Australian subsidiary of global optometry company Specsavers. Between 2015 and 2020, he served as its General Legal Director in Guernsey.

Since 2020, Kontelj has served as the Group General Counsel of the Australian optometry company Bailey Nelson.

In 2019-2020, Kontelj was Honorary Consul of the Republic of Slovenia to the States of Guernsey, United Kingdom of Great Britain and Northern Ireland. In 2022, Srechko was appointed Honorary Consul of the Republic of Slovenia for Victoria.

== Political career ==
First elected in 1998, Dr Kontelj served for 17 years on the Greater Geelong City Council, representing the Kildare Ward, which takes in Newtown, Chilwell, Manifold Heights, Herne Hill, the township of Fyansford and parts of Stonehaven.

During his time on Council, Kontelj served as Mayor of Geelong from March 2001 until April 2002, and as Deputy Mayor from 27 November 2012 to 27 May 2013. He announced his resignation from Council effective 31 July 2015, as he had taken a job with Specsavers which required him to move to Guernsey.

Kontelj is a long-standing member of the Liberal Party. He ran unsuccessfully for the division of Corio in the 1996 Australian federal election, and for the electoral district of Geelong in the 2002 Victorian state election.

In 2024, Kontelj was elected as a member of the Greater Geelong City Council for Kardinia Ward, and was elected Mayor.

== Honours ==
Kontelj has a long history of community involvement, particularly in supporting ethnic communities for which he was awarded an Order of Australia Medal in 2001 in the Queen's Birthday Honours List. In 2003 Kontelj was awarded the Centenary Medal for services to local government, and in 2010 he was awarded the Australian Defence Medal for service to the Australian Defence Force as a Specialist Reserve Legal Officer.

== Personal life ==
Stretch Kontelj and his wife Paula have three children. Paula is a former radio personality on 93.9 Bay FM, and ran unsuccessfully for the seat of Geelong in the 2014 Victorian state election, representing the Liberal Party.

Kontelj's brother Eddy Kontelj has also served on the Greater Geelong City Council since 2010, representing Cowie Ward.
