= Alister Paterson =

Australian politician

Alister Irvine Paterson (born 14 March 1959) is a former Australian politician. He was the Liberal member for South Barwon in the Victorian Legislative Assembly from October 1992 to November 2002.

Paterson was born in Melbourne to John Austin Paterson and Marjorie Webber Ball. He was educated at Scotch College, and subsequently became a journalist, although he also worked as a sales and programming executive.

Paterson was a founding member of the Melbourne branch of the Liberal Party in 1982 and worked for party media training from 1982 to 1991. From 1987 to 1989 he was senior newsreader on ATV10, and a radio host and commentator on 3AW from 1988 to 1990. From 1991 to 1992 he was a self-employed media consultant.

Paterson was Principal Adviser to Federal Senator for Victoria the Hon. Sarah Henderson from May 2020 to Feb 2021.

In 1992, Paterson was selected to contest the state seat of South Barwon against Liberal-turned-Independent MP Harley Dickinson. Paterson defeated Dickinson to win the seat. He sat as a backbencher from his election until his defeat in 2002.

Parliament of Victoria
Preceded by Harley Dickinson	Member for South Barwon; 1992–2002	Succeeded by Michael Crutchfield
