= Peter McMullin =

Victoria Australian mayor

Peter McMullin (born 25 April 1952) is an Australian businessman, lawyer and philanthropist. He was the mayor of Geelong in 2006 and deputy lord mayor of Melbourne between 1996 and 1999. McMullin also held the role of president of VECCI between 2010 and 2013, was chairman of the Melbourne International Comedy Festival between 2000 and 2008 and was the deputy president of the Museums Board of Victoria between 2000 and 2010.

McMullin is the eldest son of the late Ian McMullin, who founded Spotless, an ASX 200 company.

== Current roles ==
Peter McMullin is currently the chairman and director of McMullin Group, an investment company that specialises in commercial property development. He is also special counsel to Cornwall Stodart Lawyers, judge for the ICC International Commercial Mediation Competition in France and vice-president for the Confederation of Asia-Pacific Chambers of Commerce and Industry (CACCI).

== Philanthropic contributions ==
In 2017, McMullin and his wife Ruth have made one of the most significant gifts in the history of Melbourne Law School to establish the world's only academic centre devoted to the issue of statelessness. The Peter McMullin Centre on Statelessness will work with governments, the not-for-profit sector and the UN on the growing problem of statelessness.

== VECCI ==
McMullin held the position of deputy president between 2003 and 2010 before taking the lead of Victoria's largest business group the Victorian Employers Chamber of Commerce and Industry (VECCI) as their president between 2010 and 2013. McMullin continued to serve as the immediate past president on the board until December 2015.

== International trade ==
In 2015, McMullin was a member of the B20 Turkey 2015 Taskforce on Trade in Istanbul, Turkey. From 2014 to 2016 he was the director of Australasian Dispute Resolution Centre, which facilitates international mediation and cross-border dispute resolution in the Asia Pacific region. From 2013 to 2015 McMullin held the position of senior international business advisor for the minister of foreign affairs, Timor-Leste.

McMullin was a board member of the International Chamber of Commerce (Aust) (ICC Australia) between 2013 and 2015 and the treasurer and council member of the Australian Institute of International Affairs Victoria between 2013 and 2014.

== The arts and comedy ==
McMullin was chairman of the Melbourne International Comedy Festival between 2000 and 2008. During this time he helped pioneer the careers of countless Australian comedians with the development of Raw Comedy, The Road Show and similar events.

Between 2004 and 2012 McMullin was a trust member of the Geelong Performing Arts Centre and from 2005 to 2013 the president of Geelong Art Gallery. During this time the Gallery acquired the Eugene von Guerard's iconic work View of Geelong. Between 2011 and 2015 McMullin was also a board member of the National Portrait Gallery in Canberra, Australia.

McMullin, as deputy president of the Museums Board of Victoria between 2000 and 2010 which saw him chair the Immigration Museum Committee. Museum Victoria is governed by Museums Board of Victoria.

== Melbourne City Council ==
McMullin was first elected to the City of Melbourne in 1996. He was later elected Melbourne's deputy lord mayor which he served until 1999. During this time he chaired the Federation Square Committee as part of the City/State partnership that created Melbourne's Federation Square.

== Geelong City Council ==
McMullin was elected to the City of Geelong Council in 2004 and subsequently Mayor of Geelong in 2005. He held the role of Mayor of Geelong from 2005 to 2006 and remained on the council until 2008.

== 2004 federal election ==
McMullin, a long-standing member of the Labor Party, stood for pre-selection in the Federal Seat of Corangamite, winning local and central party support. He achieved a swing of 3.2%, however, the incumbent Stewart McArthur of the Liberal Party retained his seat. The Labor Party went on to win the Federal Seat of Corangamite in 2007.

== 2008 lord mayor candidacy ==
In October 2008, McMullin announced his candidacy for Lord Mayor of Melbourne following John So's decision to not contest for a third term in the November 2008 elections. Robert Doyle was ultimately elected Lord Mayor in 2008.
