= Darryn Lyons =

Australian media personality and politician (born 1965)

Mayor of Geelong
- In office 26 November 2013 – 16 April 2016
- Deputy: Bruce Harwood; Michelle Heagney
- Preceded by: Keith Fagg
- Succeeded by: Bruce Harwood

Personal details
- Born: 19 August 1965 (age 61) Geelong, Victoria, Australia
- Party: Independent (since 2018)
- Other political affiliations: Liberal (until 2018)
- Education: Geelong East Technical School
- Occupation: Paparazzo, entrepreneur, mayor, celebrity

Darryn Lyons (born 19 August 1965) is an Australian media personality, entrepreneur and politician who rose to prominence in Australia and the United Kingdom as a paparazzo. He served as the Mayor of Geelong from 2013 to 2016.

== Early life ==
Born in Geelong, Victoria, Australia, on 19 August 1965, Lyons grew up the youngest of three children in the suburb of Herne Hill, and later Leopold. His father was an architect and churchman. Lyons's passion for photography started at a young age, and he attended Geelong East Technical School.

== Photography career ==
After completing his intermediate year of secondary schooling, Lyons began work as a cadet photographer at the Geelong News and Geelong Advertiser. At the age of 22, he moved to London, where he gained a job at the News of the World. Two years later, he left to take a position with the Daily Mail, for whom he provided coverage of the Bosnian War.

In 1993, Lyons founded the picture company Big Pictures, which supplied paparazzi-style photography for news organisations. Big Pictures was run by his wife Melanie Lyons and Kevin Anstey, while Lyons worked as a photographer for the Daily Mail newspaper. During 1996, Darryn Lyons left the Daily Mail to work full-time at Big Pictures alongside Melanie Lyons.

He gained widespread media attention when his company sold a photograph to the News of the World, which was used to support a claim that football star David Beckham was having an affair with his personal assistant Rebecca Loos.

On the night of the fatal car crash involving Princess Diana in 1997, Big Pictures allegedly received photographs from its Paris agent Laurent Sola of Diana's final moments. Lyons alleges that he still owns these photos, which have never been published, and he has stated that he never would sell them. The existence of these photographs has never been substantiated, and Lyons’ claims of ownership of these photographs were never proven. Lyons allegedly was called to give evidence at the 2007 inquest into Diana's death. Lyons attendance at the Inquest has also never been substantiated.

The company often faced legal action relating to invasion of privacy and harassment, from celebrities including Sienna Miller, Lily Allen, JK Rowling, Hugh Grant and Elizabeth Hurley.

Big Pictures also ran a Mr Paparazzi website and YouTube channel from 2007 to 2013, featuring celebrity news, photos and videos.

In 2012, Big Pictures was placed into administration after facing financial difficulties, with all staff members of the company being made redundant. Lyons subsequently established the Mr Paparazzi Celebrity Deals company and became a shareholder of another firm called BPGG Limited, facilitating the purchase of Big Pictures' assets for £164,000. Big Pictures went into liquidation in 2013, owing more than £82,000 to photographers and picture agencies.

In 2013, Lyons announced plans to launch an online celebrity stock photographic agency called Celebstock; however, these plans did not materialise.

== Media personality ==
Lyons has frequently appeared on radio and television programmes, including the Sky News Sunrise programme, LK Today, Australian radio shows Kyle and Jackie O Show and Hughsey and Kate, and a role as a weekly commentator on ITV1's Alan Titchmarsh Show. Lyons has also written for the Geelong Advertiser newspaper and NW magazine.

He was one of the five venture capitalists on the 2005 Australian version of the reality television programme Dragons' Den, which ended after one season after poor ratings.

In 2007, Lyons appeared on the British reality television shows Tycoon, and Deadline, as a picture editor and camera instructor. Lyons also appeared on the British panel show Through the Keyhole.

In 2011, he appeared in the British Top Gear television show, representing Australia in a double-decker car race in the theme of The Ashes.

He also became a housemate in the UK version of Celebrity Big Brother on Channel 5, entering the house in August 2011. Within a few days of entering the Big Brother house, Lyons unveiled his cosmetic "six-pack", which caused a high volume of media coverage for being a "sculpted six pack seemingly implanted atop his generous gut". He finished in sixth place.

In 2012, Lyons was a contestant in the Australian show Excess Baggage. The show was transferred to digital channel GO! shortly after its premiere due to poor ratings. Following the show's completion, it was deemed a failure, with numerous people identifying the contestants as the reason for the lack of success.

== Mayor of Geelong ==
In 2013, Lyons announced his candidacy for the City of Greater Geelong 2013 mayoral election. At the start of the election he was quoted as saying, "As I have learnt from my time in the UK every election needs a comedy candidate and also as I've seen from Tony Abbott's example the electorate respects a man with great abs". Despite this he then campaigned heavily for the position with a "presidential-style mayoral campaign", including having a plane tow a banner across the sky in the city. He was declared elected after the distribution of preferences on 25 November 2013; Lyons garnered almost 30 per cent of the first-preference votes, more than double the primary votes than the second-placed candidate. Lyons was sworn into office on 26 November 2013.

As mayor, Lyons has focussed on lobbying for the city, creating publicity and lifting the city's profile to attract tourism and investment.

Lyons advocated for building a cruise ship pier on the Geelong Waterfront to boost the city's economy with tourism. The pier would also incorporate a convention centre and cultural centre.

Other initiatives introduced by Lyons include improving the city centre by making street parking free on weekends and planting plants in the streets.

On 16 April 2016, the Government of Victoria dismissed Lyons along with the rest of the Greater Geelong City Council, following a Commission of Inquiry which found that the council was riven with conflict, unable to manage Geelong's economic challenges, had dysfunctional leadership and had a culture of bullying. The government appointed administrators to run the council until council elections were held on 27 October 2017.

Lyons ran as an Independent candidate in the 2018 Victorian state election but was unsuccessful.

== Personal life ==
Lyons resides in the Western Beach area of Geelong. His fiancée was Elissa Friday, a former model and a student who now lists herself as single on her Instagram account. He was formerly married to Melanie Whitehead, who left him in 2000. Lyons is a friend of former Melbourne mayor Robert Doyle, who supported Lyons during his 2013 electoral campaign. Lyons has acknowledged drug abuse, binge drinking and heavy gambling during his life abroad.

On 9 March 2023 the UK First-tier Tribunal dismissed an appeal by Lyons against an assessment to capital gains tax of £1,087,413.68 in respect of the sale of various UK properties during the tax year 2012–2013 issued by HMRC.
