= Richard Dowling =

Richard Dowling or Dick Dowling may refer to:

- Richard W. Dowling (1838–1867), commander at the Second Battle of Sabine Pass in the American Civil War
- Dick Dowling (1938–2024), Irish Fine Gael politician, TD and senator
- Richard Dowling (writer) (1846–1898), Irish novelist
- Richard Dowling (Australian politician), Australian senator from Tasmania since 2025
