= Electoral district of Geelong (Victorian Legislative Council) =

Former electoral district of the Victorian Legislative Council

Coordinates: 38°09′S 144°21′E

The Electoral district of Geelong was one of the original sixteen electoral districts of the old unicameral Victorian Legislative Council from 1851 to 1856. Victoria was a British colony in Australia at the time.

The Electoral district of Geelong's area was defined as: "Bounded by a line drawn from a point on the eastern shores of Corio Bay near Point Henry at a distance of 2 miles from the north-east corner of the Township of Geelong as a centre bearing southerly to a point bearing east from the said corner thence by a line south crossing a small portion of Corio Bay parallel with and at a distance of 2 miles from the eastern boundary of the said township to a point bearing east from the south-east corner of the said Township of Geelong thence by a line drawn westerly at a distance of 2 miles from the southern boundary of the said township crossing the Barwon River and Waurn Chain of Ponds to a point 2 miles west of the south-west corner of the said township thence by a line bearing north parallel with and at a distance of 2 miles from the western boundary of the said Township of Geelong to a point bearing west from the north-west corner of the said township thence by a line drawn at a distance of 2 miles from the north-west corner of the said township as a centre to the western shore of Corio Bay near Cowie's Creek and also to include the remaining portion of the reserve at Point Henry and the reserve at the junction of the Moorabool with the Barwon River."

From 1856 onwards, the Victorian parliament consisted of two houses, the Victorian Legislative Council (upper house, consisting of Provinces) and the Victorian Legislative Assembly (lower house).

== Members for Geelong ==
Two members initially, three from the expansion of the Council in 1853.

Member 1	Term	Member 2	Term		
James Strachan	Nov 1851 – Mar 1856	Robert Robinson	Nov 1851 – May 1852	Member 3	Term
James Strachan	Nov 1851 – Mar 1856	Alexander Thomson	Jun 1852^{[b]} – Aug 1854	James Cowie	Aug 1853 – May 1854^{[r]}
James Strachan	Nov 1851 – Mar 1856	James Harrison	Nov 1854 – Mar 1856	Alexander Fyfe	Jun 1854^{[b]} – Mar 1856

== Notes ==
^{r} = resigned
^{b} = by-election

Fyfe (Nov. 1856 to Nov. 1857), Thomson (Dec. 1857 to Apr. 1859) and Harrison (Apr. 1858 to Aug. 1859) went on to represent the electoral district of Geelong in the Victorian Legislative Assembly.
Cowie went on to represent South-Western Province (Nov. 1856 to Sep. 1858) in the Victorian Legislative Council.

== See also ==
- Parliaments of the Australian states and territories
- List of members of the Victorian Legislative Council
