= 2013 Greater Geelong mayoral by-election =

Mayoral election in the City of Greater Geelong, Victoria, Australia

City of Greater Geelong Mayoral By-Election, 2013
- 24 November 2013
- Turnout: 78.26%
| Candidate | Darryn Lyons | Stephanie Asher |
| Party | Liberal | Independent |
| Popular vote | 38,406 | 18,606 |
| Percentage | 29.79% | 14.43% |
Mayor before election
Keith Fagg
Independent
Elected mayor
Darryn Lyons
Liberal

A by-election for the City of Greater Geelong mayor occurred on 24 November 2013. This by-election was triggered by the resignation of Geelong's first directly elected mayor Keith Fagg and saw Darryn Lyons of the Liberal Party become Geelong's second directly elected mayor with a first-preference vote of 29.79%. Lyons' nearest rival, Stephanie Asher, achieved a primary vote of 14.43%.

== Background ==
Geelong's first directly elected mayor, Keith Fagg, resigned from his position in August 2013, just over a year following his election, citing health reasons.

== Campaign ==
Over the course of the mayoral campaign, the local media focused heavily on Darryn Lyons and former mayor Ken Jarvis.

On 6 November, the Geelong Advertiser hosted a Mayoral candidate forum with a crowd of over 600 people, and Ken Jarvis won the exit poll which was taken by 200 people.

Controversy arose when Geelong businessman Frank Costa publicly backed Jarvis; stating that the "state government wouldn't muck around" and that it "may intervene and sack the council if Ken Jarvis isn't elected". The next day, however, Victorian Premier Denis Napthine, along with Costa, denied claims that the council would be sacked.

== Candidates ==
A total of 16 candidates ran in this election.:

Candidate nominations
| Independent | Lily Stefanovic | |
| Independent | Stephen Yewdall | |
| Independent | Greg Jones | |
| Independent | Stephanie Asher | |
| Liberal | Darryn Lyons | |
| Victorian Greens | Greg Lacey | |
| Labor | John Mitchell | Former Mayor of Geelong. |
| Liberal | Kenneth Edward Jarvis | Former Mayor of Geelong. |
| Independent | Margarette Lewis | |
| Independent | Tom O'Conner | |
| Independent | Anthony Aitken | |
| Independent | John Smith | |
| Independent | Rodger Marsden | |
| Liberal | Angelo Kakouros | |
| Independent | John Robert Irvine | Current councillor representing Geelong's Austin Ward. |
| Independent | Doug Mann | |
