= James Strachan (Australian politician) =

Australian politician

James Ford Strachan (1810 – 14 April 1875) was a merchant, grazier and politician in colonial Victoria, Australia, and a member of the Victorian Legislative Council.

Strachan was born in Montrose, Scotland, the fifth son of John Strachan and his wife Isobel, née Smith. Strachan arrived in Van Diemen's Land in 1832 with his widowed mother and two sisters. He was an early settler in Port Phillip District (which later became Victoria), and a leading merchant in Melbourne, in which city he built the first brick store.

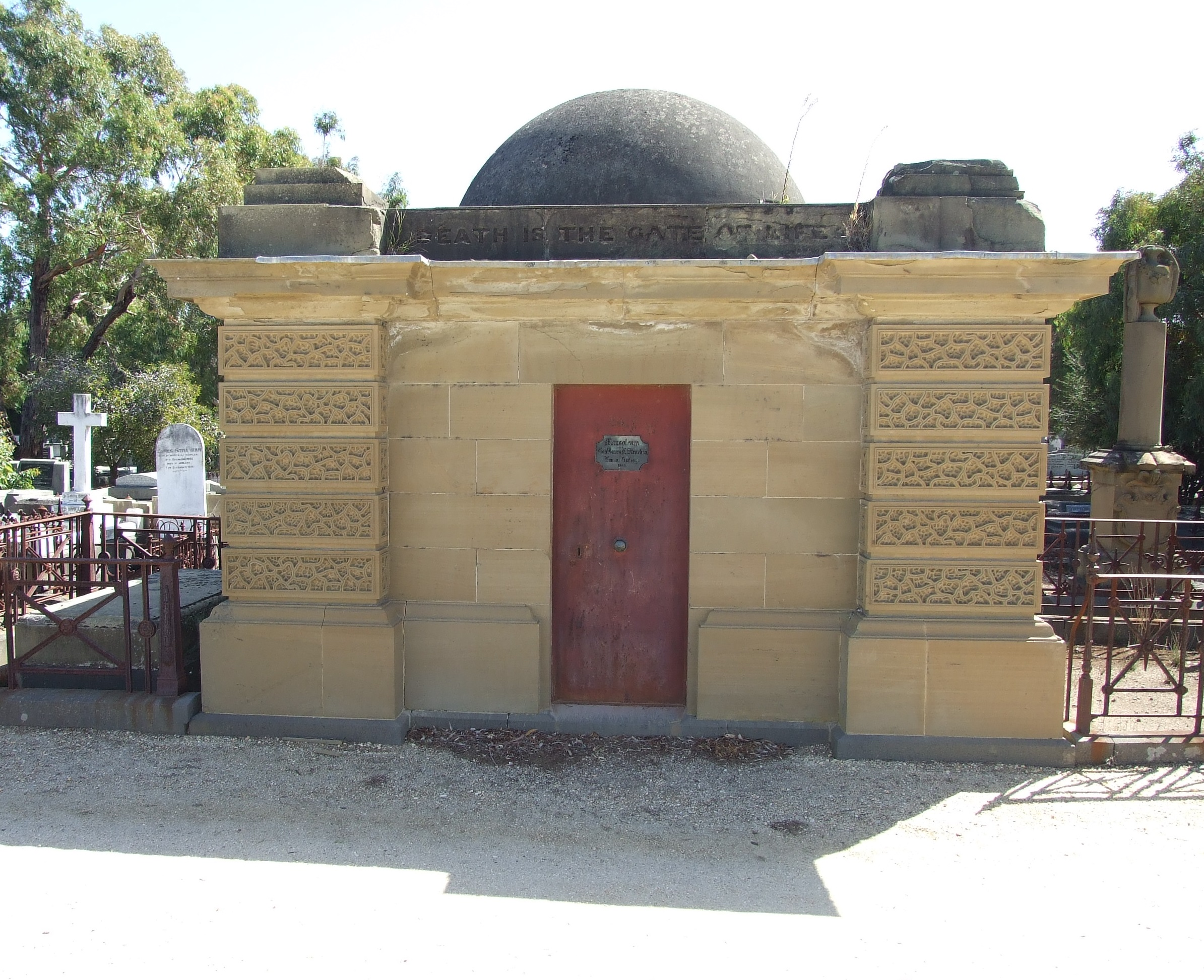
Mausoleum of James Strachan at Geelong's Western Cemetery

Strachan was an active promoter of separation from New South Wales and, when the colony of Victoria was constituted in 1851, in October of that year he was returned to the semi-elective Victorian Legislative Council, the only parliamentary chamber at the time, as member for Geelong. After responsible government was conceded in 1855, Strachan was elected to the first wholly elective Legislative Council for the South-Western Province in November 1856. He was a member of the second Haines Ministry without portfolio from April 1857 to March 1858.

Strachan took a leading part on the side of the Legislative Council during the great constitutional battle between the two houses of the Victorian Parliament over the imposition of tariffs and the grant of £20,000 to the wife of the recently dismissed governor, Sir Charles Darling ("the Darling tack"). Strachan resigned his seat of South-Western Province and successfully contested the August 1866 election for Western Province against Henry Miller, who had accepted ministerial office under the premier James McCulloch. Strachan held the seat until September 1874.

Strachan died at Geelong, Victoria on 14 April 1875, aged sixty-five years. He was married to Lilias Cross née Murray, daughter of Hugh Murray, a fellow Scottish emigrant, merchant and grazier.

Victorian Legislative Council
New district	Member for Geelong; 1851–1856; With: Robert Robinson 1851–1852; Alexander Thomson 1852–1854; James Cowie 1853–1854; Alexander Fyfe 1854–1856; James Harrison 1854–1856	Original Council abolished
New district	Member for South Western Province; 1856–1866; With: James Henty 1856–66; William Roope1856–60, John McCrae 1860–66; J. Cowie 1856–58, G. Coppin 1858–63, C. Jenner 1863–66; Robert Hope 1856–64, John Lowe 1864–66	Succeeded by George Rolfe
Preceded by Henry Miller	Member for Western Province; 1866–1874; With: Stephen Henty 1866–70, William Skene 1870–74; Charles Sladen 1866–68, Robert Simson 1868–74; James Palmer 1866–70, Thomas McKellar 1870–74; Niel Black 1866–74	Succeeded by Thomas Bromell
