= Darren Cheeseman =

Australian politician

Darren Cheeseman MP
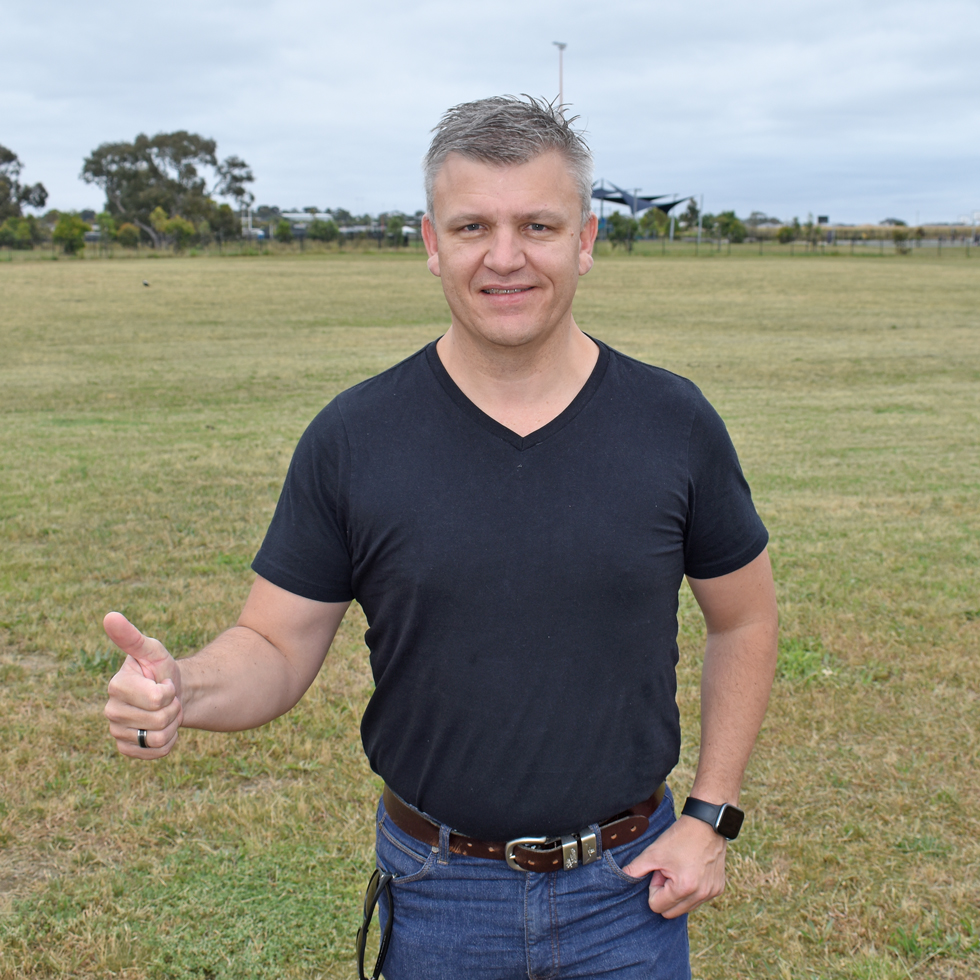

Member of the Victorian Parliament for South Barwon
- Incumbent
- Assumed office 24 November 2018
- Preceded by: Andrew Katos

Member of the Australian Parliament for Corangamite
- In office 24 November 2007 – 7 September 2013
- Preceded by: Stewart McArthur
- Succeeded by: Sarah Henderson

Personal details
- Born: 8 June 1976 (age 50) Christchurch, New Zealand
- Party: Independent (since 2024; parliamentary affiliation)
- Other political affiliations: Labor (Note: In 2024, Cheeseman was suspended from the Labor Party caucus. He still remains a rank-and-file member of the party.)
- Education: University of Ballarat
- Occupation: Union organiser
- Website: www.darrencheeseman.org.au

Darren Leicester Cheeseman (born 8 June 1976) is an Australian politician. He has been a member of the Victorian Legislative Assembly since November 2018, representing the seat of South Barwon. He previously held the federal seat of Corangamite from 2007 to 2013.

Cheeseman was born in Christchurch, New Zealand. He grew up in Ballarat and attended Mount Clear College. He later studied for a Bachelor of Applied Science in Geology at the University of Ballarat. He worked for the Association for the Blind, and during that time also served as a councillor for the City of Ballarat. He later worked for the Community and Public Sector Union.

In 2006, Cheeseman contested Labor preselection for Corangamite against the Labor candidate at the 2004 election, former Geelong mayor Peter McMullin. Having secured preselection, he went on to defeat long-time Liberal incumbent Stewart McArthur with a 6.6% swing. McArthur had held the seat since 1984. Cheeseman attributed his win to opposition to WorkChoices, the Liberal government's industrial relations laws. Cheeseman was only the third Labor member ever to win Corangamite, and the first since 1929. He narrowly held Corangamite at the 2010 election, against Liberal candidate Sarah Henderson, becoming the first Labor member to win a second term in the seat. However, he was defeated by Henderson at the 2013 federal election.

In 2018, Cheeseman was elected to the Victorian Legislative Assembly as the Labor member for South Barwon. In 2022, Cheeseman was re-elected to the Victorian Legislative Assembly as the Labor Member for South Barwon.

In 2024, Cheeseman was forced to resign from the Parliamentary Labor Party after allegations that he had harassed a staffer.

Prior to the 2026 state election, concerns were raised over Cheeseman's role as the local member, as he had missed 70% of sitting days since leaving the Parliamentary Labor Party, and had deactivated his webpage and social media. While claiming over $60,000 in Parliamentary allowances, designed to allow members from seats outside the Melbourne area to carry out their public duties in Melbourne. He declined to comment on the matter, or to confirm if he would stand for re-election at the 2026 election. He did not nominate for re-election.

== Notes ==
Parliament of Australia
Preceded by Stewart McArthur	Member for Corangamite; 2007–2013	Succeeded by Sarah Henderson
Parliament of Victoria
Preceded by Andrew Katos	Member for South Barwon; 2018–2026	Incumbent
