= H. G. Simms =

Chairman of the Shanghai Municipal Council (1922–1923)

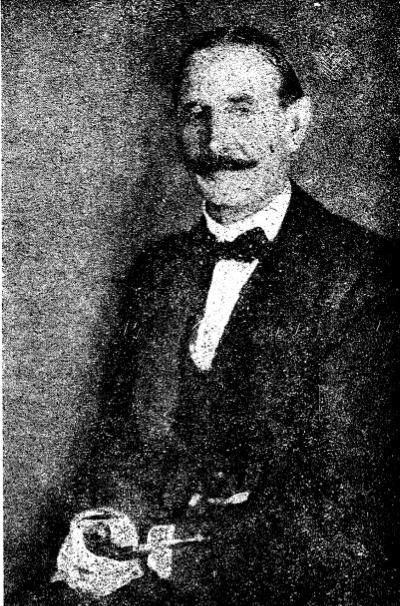

Chairman of the Shanghai International Settlement's Municipal Council
- In office March 1922 – October 1923
- Preceded by: Alfred Brooke-Smith
- Succeeded by: Stirling Fessenden

Personal details
- Born: Ireland
- Profession: Businessman

H. G. Simms was the Chairman of Shanghai International Settlement's Municipal Council from 1922 to 1923. He was also Chairman of the Shanghai Club from 1914 to 1920.

== Biography ==
Simms was born in Strabane, County Tyrone, Ireland. After leaving school, he went to Belfast where he served an apprenticeship with a merchant firm remaining with them for eight years. He was then appointed an inspector for the Caledonian Insurance Company. He worked in the London office of the North China Insurance Company for three years. In 1899, he moved to Hong Kong as head of the North China Insurance Company's Hong Kong office and in 1908 was promoted to secretary of the company in its head office in Shanghai. While he was in Shanghai the North China Insurance Company amalgamated with the Union Insurance Society of Canton. Simms continued as secretary of the North China Insurance Company and branch manager of the Union of Canton Insurance Company.

Simms was Hon. Treasurer and later President of the St Patrick's Society in Shanghai and was also Chairman of the Shanghai Club from 1914 to 1920.

In 1920, he was elected to the Shanghai Municipal Council, which had limited powers in the Shanghai International Settlement, and in 1922 became Chairman on the retirement of Alfred Brooke-Smith. He served until October 1923, when he also resigned to return to London with his firm. He served as London manager of the Union Insurance Society of Canton until 1 July 1936 when he retired due to ill health intending to spend his time between Ireland and London. In London he was also Hon. Treasurer of the China Association and Chairman of the British Residents'a Association London Committee.

== Marriage ==
Simms was married and had two daughters. His second daughter, Helen Mary, married Peter Stephens in 1934.
