= Robert Robinson (Australian politician) =

Australian politician and hotel-keeper

Robert Robinson (c.1811 – 14 May 1852) was a hotel-keeper and politician in colonial Victoria (Australia).

Robinson was licensee of Commercial Hotel, Corio, from 1841. Mercer was elected to the district of Geelong in the inaugural Victorian Legislative Council in October 1851.

Robinson died on 14 May 1852, he was married to Elizabeth Mary, who survived him.

Victorian Legislative Council
New creation	Member for Geelong; Oct 1851 – May 1852; With: James Strachan	Succeeded by Alexander Thomson
