= Patrick Dowling =

Patrick Dowling is the name of:

- Patrick Dowling (producer) (1919–2009), British TV producer
- Patrick Dowling (hurler), member of the Kerry hurling squad
- Patrick J. Dowling (born 1939), British engineer and educationalist, vice-chancellor of the University of Surrey
