= Garry Spry =

Australian politician

Garry Howard Spry (born 9 May 1939) is a former Australian politician. He was the Liberal member for Bellarine in the Victorian Legislative Assembly from 1992 to 2002.

Spry was born in Gawler, South Australia, to Frank Spry and Joyce Dawkins. He attended primary school in the Gawler area and later at Tallageira West in Victoria. He attended Geelong Grammar School from 1947 to 1957 before managing the family grazing property from 1958 to 1970. In 1970 he became a shearer and heavy plant operator, before becoming a fencing contractor in 1972 and a real estate salesman in 1981. In 1984 he founded his own company, Spryline, of which he became director. He was also a Queenscliffe Borough Councillor from 1974 to 1980, and president of the Queenscliff branch of the Liberal Party from 1973 to 1975.

In 1992, Spry was elected as the Liberal member for Bellarine in the Victorian Parliament. He sat in parliament as a backbencher until his retirement in 2002.

Parliament of Victoria
Preceded by Graham Ernst	Member for Bellarine; 1992–2002	Succeeded by Lisa Neville
