= Keith Fagg =

Australian businessman

Keith Fagg OAM
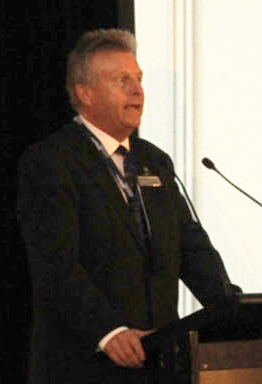

94th Mayor of Geelong
- In office 5 November 2012 – 16 August 2013
- Deputy: Bruce Harwood
- Preceded by: John Mitchell
- Succeeded by: Darryn Lyons

Personal details
- Born: Keith Andrew Fagg; 30 September 1955 (age 71) Geelong, Victoria, Australia
- Party: Independent
- Profession: Businessman

Keith Andrew Fagg OAM (born 30 September 1955) is an Australian businessman who served as the 94th Mayor of Geelong.

Fagg serves as a director of long-established family-run business called Fagg's Mitre 10 in Geelong. Samuel and William Fagg founded the firm in 1854 after migrating from Deal in England.

Fagg was elected for a four-year term as Mayor of Geelong in the 2012 mayoral election, winning with a significant primary vote of 43%, and was sworn in on 5 November 2012.

This was the first time the office was selected by means of a direct election, following changes introduced by the Victorian Government in 2012. Previous mayors of Geelong were elected by fellow members of the city council.

On 16 August 2013, Fagg announced his resignation from the position, citing unspecified health concerns. It was later reported that Fagg had been suffering from stress.

Prominent Geelong figure Frank Costa claimed that Fagg had been "bullied to the point of breakdown"; however, he did not specify the source of the bullying. Reports of an "entrenched culture of bullying" in the City of Greater Geelong council have since come to light. Keith Fagg has stated that he agrees that a skilled investigator was needed to uncover the full extent of bullying within the council rather than a mediator.

Fagg has been involved as a volunteer with many organisations in the Geelong area. He was awarded the OAM in 2018 "for service to the community of Geelong". He writes a regular opinion piece for the Geelong Advertiser.
