= Kevin Dowling =

Kevin Dowling may refer to:

- Kevin Dowling (bishop) (born 1944), South African Roman Catholic bishop
- Kevin Dowling (director), American film and television director and producer
