= Electoral district of South Barwon =

State electoral district of Victoria, Australia

South Barwon Victoria—Legislative Assembly
- Interactive map of electoral district boundaries from the 2022 state election
- State: Victoria
- Created: 1976
- MP: Darren Cheeseman
- Party: Independent Labor
- Namesake: City of South Barwon
- Electors: 51,546 (2022)
- Area: 390.79 km^{2} (150.9 sq mi)
- Demographic: Urbanised rural
Electorates around South Barwon:
Polwarth	Geelong	Geelong
Polwarth	South Barwon	Bellarine
Bass Strait	Bass Strait	Bass Strait

South Barwon is an electoral district of the Legislative Assembly in the Australian state of Victoria. Located in a mixed urban and rural area south of the Barwon River, it covers an area of 621 km², including the Geelong suburbs of Belmont and Grovedale, Waurn Ponds and part of Highton, the coastal centre of Torquay and the rural towns of Barrabool, Bellbrae, Connewarre, Gnarwarre, Modewarre, Moriac and Mount Moriac. The electorate had a population of 92,460 at the 2021 census.

South Barwon was created in 1976 as a predominantly rural seat which was considered safe for the conservative Liberal Party. It was won by Liberal Aurel Smith, formerly the member for Bellarine, upon its inception, and retained for the party by Harley Dickinson upon Smith's retirement in 1982. Dickinson held the seat until 1992, when he quit the party and attempted to retain the seat as an independent, but lost to endorsed Liberal candidate and former television newsreader Alister Paterson. The seat underwent significant demographic change during Paterson's tenure as successive redistributions pushed it further into Geelong.

Major population growth in the traditionally Labor-voting areas of Torquay, Barwon Heads and southern Geelong, caused the seat to become progressively less safe for the Liberal Party. These changes came to a head at the 2002 election, when the Labor Party nominated former Geelong mayor Michael Crutchfield as its candidate, and amidst a statewide landslide victory, he succeeded in taking South Barwon for the first time. Crutchfield was re-elected in 2006, but lost in 2010 to local councillor and Liberal candidate Andrew Katos. Katos was re-elected in 2014 but was defeated by former federal MP Darren Cheeseman in 2018. Katos re-contested South Barwon in 2022 in an attempt to win back his former seat, however Cheeseman easily retained the seat with 59.8% of the two-party-preferred vote, on the back of a 6.8% swing towards Labor. This was the strongest result for Labor in the seat’s history. Cheeseman was removed from the Labor Party caucus in 2024, over allegations of harassment of a staffer, although continued to sit in Parliament as a member of the Labor Party. He would later refuse to confirm if he would stand for re-election, before failing to nominate prior to the 2026 election.

== Members for South Barwon ==
Member	Party	Term
Aurel Smith	Liberal	1976–1982
Harley Dickinson	Liberal	1982–1992
Harley Dickinson	Independent	1992–1992
Alister Paterson	Liberal	1992–2002
Michael Crutchfield	Labor	2002–2010
Andrew Katos	Liberal	2010–2018
Darren Cheeseman	Labor	2018–2024
Darren Cheeseman	Independent Labor	2024–2026

== Election results ==
2022 Victorian state election: South Barwon
Party	Candidate	Votes	%	±%
Labor	Darren Cheeseman	19,969	44.2	+5.6
Liberal	Andrew Katos	14,516	32.1	−6.5
Greens	Genevieve Frances Dawson-Scott	5,719	12.6	+4.2
Family First	Alan Barron	1,338	3.0	+3.0
Democratic Labour	Leone Bates	1,099	2.4	−0.6
Animal Justice	Naomi Adams	1,076	2.4	−0.7
Justice	Jeynelle Marie Dean	891	2.0	+2.0
Freedom	Simone Tomlinson	576	1.3	+1.3
Total formal votes		45,184	96.5	+1.0
Informal votes		1,637	3.5	−1.0
Turnout		46,821	90.8	+1.9
Two-party-preferred result
Labor	Darren Cheeseman	27,020	59.8	+6.8
Liberal	Andrew Katos	18,164	40.2	−6.8
Labor hold		Swing	+6.8	
