= Dan Dowling =

American cartoonist

- Born: November 16, 1906
- Died: July 27, 1993 (aged 86); Monterey, California, U.S.
- Occupation: Cartoonist
- Children: 1 son, 1 daughter

Dan Dowling (November 16, 1906– July 27, 1993) was an American cartoonist. His work was published in the New York Herald Tribune, the Omaha World Herald, and the Kansas City Star. Some of his work can be seen at the Brooklyn Museum.
