= William Dowling =

William Dowling may refer to:

- William Dowling (VC) (1825–1887), Irish recipient of the Victoria Cross
- William C. Dowling (born 1944), American professor of English
- William Dowling (politician), Northern Irish politician
- Willie Dowling, English multi-instrumentalist
