= Dereck Dowling =

South African cricketer

Personal information
- Full name: Dereck Frank Dowling
- Born: 25 May 1914; Pietermaritzburg, Natal, South Africa
- Died: 30 May 2003 (aged 89); Durban, KwaZulu-Natal, South Africa
- Batting: Left-handed
- Bowling: Right-arm leg-spin

Domestic team information
- Years: Team
- 1937–38 to 1938–39: Border
- 1939–40 to 1945–46: North-Eastern Transvaal
- 1946–47 to 1953–54: Natal

Career statistics
Competition	First-class
Matches	57
Runs scored	2871
Batting average	36.80
100s/50s	5/17
Top score	106
Balls bowled	3506
Wickets	72
Bowling average	24.44
5 wickets in innings	2
10 wickets in match	0
Best bowling	6/24
Catches/stumpings	41/–
- Source: Cricinfo, 21 April 2018

Dereck Frank Dowling (25 May 1914 – 30 May 2003) was a South African cricketer who played first-class cricket from 1937 to 1954.

A stylish left-handed middle-order batsman and leg-spin bowler, Dowling made his first-class debut in the 1937–38 Currie Cup season. Batting at number five for Border against Western Province, he scored 84 and 40 not out in a seven-wicket victory for Border. He played for North-Eastern Transvaal in 1939–40. In the nine matches he played before the Second World War he made six fifties.

He joined Natal in 1946–47, helping them win three of the next five Currie Cup competitions. He twice made his highest score of 106: in an innings victory for Natal over North-Eastern Transvaal in 1947–48, and in a draw against Transvaal in 1952–53. His best bowling figures of 6 for 24 enabled Natal to dismiss Border for 60 and claim an innings victory in the opening match of the 1950–51 Currie Cup.

Although he was considered for the tours of England in 1951 and Australia and New Zealand in 1952–53, he never played Test cricket. The New Zealand player John Reid said Dowling was "perhaps the best batsman – and the unluckiest – never to be selected for South Africa".

He was the president of the Natal Cricket Association from 1974 to 1986. His father, Henry, and younger brother Justin also played Currie Cup cricket.
