= Alison Marchant =

Australian politician

Alison Marchant MLA

Member of the Victorian Legislative Assembly for Bellarine
- Incumbent
- Assumed office 26 November 2022
- Preceded by: Lisa Neville

Personal details
- Born: Leopold, Victoria, Australia
- Political party: Labor

Alison Marchant is an Australian politician who is the current member for the district of Bellarine in the Victorian Legislative Assembly. She is a member of the Labor Party and was elected in the 2022 state election, after replacing retiring MLA Lisa Neville.

== Early life ==
Marchant was born and raised in Leopold to a farming family.

== Career ==
Marchant is a former primary school teacher and anti-fracking campaigner who worked as an electorate officer for Deputy Prime Minister Richard Marles.
