= Brian Dowling =

Brian Dowling may refer to:

- Brian Dowling (presenter) (born 1978), Irish television presenter
- Brian Dowling (American football) (born 1947), American football player
- Brian Dowling (hurler) (born 1983), Irish hurler
