= Edmund Walpole Brooke =

Australian painter

- Born: September 13, 1865; Eaglemont, Victoria, Australia
- Died: 1938 (aged 72–73)
- Known for: Painting

Edmund Walpole Brooke (18 September 1865 – 1938) was an Australian painter. Born in Melbourne, Brooke moved to Japan in his youth, where his father, John Henry Brooke, was a reporter and director of the Japan Daily Herald. He married a Japanese woman and they had a daughter.

He exhibited at the Royal Academy, London and the Paris Salon in 1890 and 1891. In 1890, he was a friend of Vincent van Gogh, and joined van Gogh on his plein air painting trips. Research on E. W. Brooke and his connection with van Gogh is being carried out by Tsukasa Kodera, a professor of art history at Osaka University.
