= John Dowling (footballer, born 1944) =

Australian rules footballer

Personal information
- Full name: John Dowling
- Born: 11 April 1944
- Original team: Caulfield Grammar
- Height: 180 cm (5 ft 11 in)
- Weight: 73 kg (161 lb)

Playing career^{1}
Years	Club	Games (Goals)
1963–67	St Kilda	37 (6)
- ^{1} Playing statistics correct to the end of 1967.

John Dowling (born 11 April 1944) is a former Australian rules footballer who played with St Kilda in the Victorian Football League (VFL).
