= Andrew Katos =

Australian politician

Member of the Victorian Parliament for South Barwon
- In office 27 November 2010 – 24 November 2018
- Preceded by: Michael Crutchfield
- Succeeded by: Darren Cheeseman

Personal details
- Born: 21 June 1970 (age 56) Geelong, Victoria, Australia
- Party: Liberal
- Children: Four
- Education: Deakin University

Andrew Katos (born 21 June 1970) is an Australian politician. He was the member for South Barwon in the Victorian Legislative Assembly from 2010 until his defeat at the 2018 state election.

Katos unsuccessfully contested the seat again in the 2022 election. He was elected to the council of the City of Greater Geelong in 2024, having previously served on the council prior to his election to state parliament in 2010.

Victorian Legislative Assembly
Preceded by Michael Crutchfield	Member for South Barwon; 2010–2018	Succeeded by Darren Cheeseman
