= Aurel Smith =

Australian politician

Aurel Vernon Smith (20 June 1915 – 6 February 2011) was an Australian politician.

Aurel was born in Geelong to wool merchant William Smith and Ruby Emily Young, he was the eldest child with a younger brother Collin Smith. A keen yachtsman, he would spend weekends competing for the Royal Geelong Yacht Club winning numerous titles Phoenix Wool Company Pty Ltd. He was a director of various other companies including J. C. Taylor and Sons Pty Ltd, Coca-Cola Bottlers (Geelong) Pty. Ltd., Smith Wool Co., Warrangee Pty Ltd, Ceres Lookout Estate Pty Ltd.

Aurel enlisted and served during World War II firstly in the Middle East, then to New Guinea and Borneo. He attained the rank of 2IC major for 2/2 Australian Anti-Aircraft Regiment. A founding member of the Liberal Party, he was president of the Geelong branch and chairman of the Western Area finance committee. In 1967 he was elected to the Victorian Legislative Assembly for Bellarine. He switched to South Barwon in 1976 and retired on 2 April 1982.

Aurel has one son Campbell William Aurel-Smith and three grandchildren, Kate, Timothy and Camilla. Smith died on 6 February 2011.

Victorian Legislative Assembly
New seat	Member for Bellarine; 1967–1976	Abolished
New seat	Member for South Barwon; 1976–1982	Succeeded by Harley Dickinson
