= Tom Dowling =

Tom or Thomas Dowling may refer to:

- Tom Dowling (American football) (1940–2018), American football coach
- Tom Dowling (rugby league) (1907–1969), Australian rugby league player
- Thomas Joseph Dowling (1840–1924), Canadian Roman Catholic bishop
