= Australian Institute of International Affairs Victoria =

Australian-based think tank

The Australian Institute of International Affairs Victoria (AIIAV) is a non-profit think tank based in Melbourne, Australia, and a branch of the national Australian Institute of International Affairs (AIIA). However, it operates independently from the National Office in Canberra and was also founded earlier than it.

Founded in 1925, the AIIAV has included many notable authorities on international affairs, among them being Sir John Latham, Sir Owen Dixon, Sir Ian Clunies Ross, E.C. Dyason, and Professors Norman Harper and Macmahon Ball. As one of the most dynamic branches of the institute, AIIAV promotes exposure to international issues through events, seminars, networking opportunities, trainings, and conferences. Its activities are mostly run by volunteers and interns.

The AIIAV office is based in Dyason House, named after E.C. Dyason, a prominent past member and one of its most generous benefactors.

The Institute itself is an independent organisation which promotes the objective study of international affairs. It has no political biases and represents a neutral forum for debating global issues. The council members are closely involved with the activities of the institute.

Like its sister Institutes in New Zealand, Canada, South Africa and India, the AIIA is affiliated with the Royal Institute of International Affairs, Chatham House, London.

Membership is open to Australian residents, corporate bodies, diplomatic representatives, schools and students.
