= James Cowie (Australian settler) =

Australian politician (1809-1892)

James Cowie (9 January 1809 – 14 November 1892) was an early 19th-century settler of Victoria, Australia, who became a member of both the Victorian Legislative Assembly and Victorian Legislative Council and also served as Mayor of Geelong.

== Life and work ==
Cowie was born in Falkirk, Scotland, the son of a brewer. After an apprenticeship as a saddler and harness maker in London, Cowie emigrated to Australia in 1840; and, after a spell in Van Diemen's Land, he settled in Geelong, which was then known as Corio. He established a number of successful commercial ventures, including shops and a mining & shipping agency, and he made his fortune during the Victorian gold rush. When the Geelong municipality was formed in 1849, he was among those who provided financial securities for the new body to carry out works and topped the poll in the first elections for the council. In November 1852, Cowie was elected mayor of Geelong. He served as mayor for a year before being elected to represent Geelong in the Legislative Council of Victoria following the separation of Victoria from New South Wales in 1851. After two years, he resigned to undertake a short visit to Britain. He returned to Australia aboard the Schomberg, which was wrecked on its maiden voyage off Port Campbell. Cowie was rescued and returned to Geelong. From October 1956 Cowie served on the new Legislative Council representing South Western Province until September 1858 before being elected to the Legislative Assembly for Geelong East.

Cowie is included in the photographic montage published by Thomas Foster Chuck in 1872 entitled "The Explorers and Early Colonists of Victoria". The Cowie ward on the present day Geelong Council is named to commemorate him.

Victorian Legislative Council
New seat	Member for Geelong; 1853–1854; Served alongside: Alexander Thomson; James Strachan	Succeeded by Alexander Fyfe
New district	Member for South Western Province; 1856–1858; Served alongside: James Henty; William Roope; Robert Hope; James Strachan	Succeeded by George Selth Coppin
Victorian Legislative Assembly
New district	Member for Geelong East; 1859–1860; Served alongside: Alexander Thomson	Succeeded by Augustus Greeves
