= Jerry Dowling =

American cartoonist

Jerry Dowling is a Canadian-born American cartoonist who has also worked in newspaper illustration. He received the National Cartoonists Society Newspaper Illustration Award in 1994 for his work.

Dowling worked for The Cincinnati Enquirer from the late 1960s to 1994. He continued to do sports cartoons for the Cincinnati alternative weekly CityBeat for 12 years. Dowling often puts a little rodent (called Dirty Rat) at the bottom of his cartoons. The rodent always has something to say. Dowling was known for cartoons of former Cincinnati Reds owner Marge Schott, depicting her with ever-increasing numbers of cigarettes hanging from her mouth.

Dowling's book Drawing Pete -- Pete Rose's Career in Drawings was published in 2008. The book is a collection from his 40 years of drawings of Cincinnati Reds player Pete Rose. He has five other books published: Drawing Super Wars -- The Cincinnati Bengals Early Years (2009), Drawing the Big Red Machine (Cincinnati Reds teams) (2010), Drawing the Hollywood Book of Fame (2014), Drawing the Grand Ole Country, and Cincinnati Hockey and Its History (2021). All can be purchased at his website, jerryjdowling.com.

He presently does numerous gift illustrations.
