= 2012 Greater Geelong City Council election =

City of Greater Geelong Council Elections, 2012
- 27 October 2012
- Turnout: 76.29%
Candidate	Keith Fagg	John Mitchell
Party	Independent	Labor
Popular vote	54,425	17,448
Percentage	43.28%	13.88%
Mayor before election
John Mitchell
Labor
Elected mayor
Keith Fagg
Independent

Elections were held for the City of Greater Geelong council in Australia on 27 October 2012. In addition to electing a new 12 member council, Geelong also directly elected its first Mayor. Independent candidate Keith Fagg won the election convincingly, winning 43.28% of the primary vote. Then-mayor Labor aligned John Mitchell won 13.88% of the vote.

== Background ==
As part of an election pledge, the Victorian state government made good on their promise to give Geelong residents the ability to directly elect their next mayor, with the bill passing through the Victorian upper-house on 9 February 2012.

John Mitchell was Geelong's Mayor for the last four years prior to this election. He unsuccessfully ran for re-election.

== Mayoral candidates ==
Nine candidates ran in this election.

Candidate nominations
Socialist Alliance	Sue Bull	
Independent	Ron Watt	
Independent	Frank Rozpara	
Independent	Stephanie Asher	
Independent	John Smith	
Labor	John Mitchell	Mayor of Geelong from 2008–2012.
Independent	Keith Fagg	Elected.
Independent	Bernadette Uzelac	
Independent	Graeme Robin	
