= Michael Crutchfield =

Australian politician

Member of the Victorian Legislative Assembly for South Barwon
- In office 30 November 2002 – 26 November 2010
- Preceded by: Alister Paterson
- Succeeded by: Andrew Katos

86th Mayor of Geelong
- In office 2000–2001
- Deputy: Ken Jarvis
- Preceded by: Stretch Kontelj

Personal details
- Born: Michael Paul Crutchfield; 12 December 1961 (age 64) Melbourne, Victoria, Australia
- Party: Labor Party
- Education: University of Western Australia, Deakin University
- Profession: Teacher, Firefighter

Michael Paul Crutchfield (born 12 December 1961) is an Australian politician. He was formerly the member for South Barwon in the Victorian Legislative Assembly.

== Early life ==
Crutchfield was born in Melbourne, but attended high school in the coastal city of Warrnambool. He studied to become a teacher at the University of Western Australia before returning to Victoria and taking up a position as a teacher at Chanel College in Geelong. Two years later, however, he left the position and took on a position as a career firefighter with the Country Fire Authority.

== Political career ==
Crutchfield ran for and was elected to the council of the City of Greater Geelong in 1995. He was a popular and high-profile councillor, and subsequently served as the city's mayor from 2000 to 2001.

Crutchfield remained on the council after losing the mayoralty, and contested Labor Party preselection for the state seat of South Barwon, which was considered a safe seat for the conservative Liberal Party, and had never been won by Labor before in its history. Aided considerably by a statewide landslide victory for Labor, Crutchfield defeated long-serving incumbent Alister Paterson in the 2002 state election, and took up his seat in parliament. He was appointed Parliamentary Secretary for Water and the Environment in 2007.

Crutchfield lost his seat in the 2010 state election.

== Personal life ==
He is an avid Geelong Cats supporter and a former coach and captain of the South Barwon Football Club. He is married. He played for Subiaco in the WAFL.

Civic offices
Preceded by Ken Jarvis	Mayor of Geelong; 2000–2001	Succeeded by Srečko Kontelj
Victorian Legislative Assembly
Preceded by Alister Paterson	Member for South Barwon; 2002–2010	Succeeded by Andrew Katos
