= Electoral district of Bellarine =

State electoral district of Victoria, Australia

Bellarine Victoria—Legislative Assembly
- Interactive map of electoral district boundaries from the 2022 state election
- State: Victoria
- Dates current: 1967–1976; 1985–present
- MP: Alison Marchant
- Party: Labor Party
- Namesake: Bellarine Peninsula
- Electors: 55,022 (2022)
- Area: 356 km^{2} (137.5 sq mi)
- Demographic: Urbanised Rural
Electorates around Bellarine:
Port Phillip Bay	Port Phillip Bay	Port Phillip Bay
Lara; South Barwon	Bellarine	Port Phillip Bay
Bass Strait	Bass Strait	Port Phillip Bay

The electoral district of Bellarine is one of the electoral districts of Victoria, Australia, for the Victorian Legislative Assembly. It covers an area of 367 square kilometres (142 sq mi) stretching from the Bellarine Peninsula to the outer eastern suburbs of Geelong. It includes the towns of Barwon Heads, Clifton Springs, Drysdale, Indented Head, Ocean Grove, Point Lonsdale, Portarlington and Queenscliff and the Geelong suburb of Leopold. It lies within the Western Victoria Region of the upper house, the Legislative Council.

The seat was first created in a redistribution prior to the 1967 election but was abolished and replaced by Geelong East and South Barwon in 1976. It was revived prior to the 1985 election after Geelong East was itself abolished and population increases in South Barwon moved that electorate westwards.

It has traditionally been a marginal seat. Graham Ernst of the Labor Party won the seat in the 1985 and 1988 elections but was defeated at the 1992 election by the Liberal Party's Garry Spry who held the seat until his retirement in 2002. At the election in November of that year it was one of many seats to fall to the Labor Party, with Lisa Neville winning the seat on a swing of over nine percent.

== Members for Bellarine ==
First incarnation (1967-1976)
Member	Party	Term
Aurel Smith	Liberal	1967–1976

Second incarnation (1985–present)
Graham Ernst	Labor	1985–1992
Garry Spry	Liberal	1992–2002
Lisa Neville	Labor	2002–2022
Alison Marchant	Labor	2022–present

== Election results ==
2022 Victorian state election: Bellarine
Party	Candidate	Votes	%	±%
Labor	Alison Marchant	20,103	42.6	−7.1
Liberal	Donnie Grigau	15,617	33.1	−2.5
Greens	Rachel Semmens	5,537	11.7	+2.6
Independent	Sarah Fenton	2,158	4.6	+4.6
Animal Justice	Adam Cardilini	1,088	2.3	−2.2
Family First	Guy Manuell	1,033	2.2	+2.2
Justice	Brett Anthony Ritchie	770	1.6	+1.6
Freedom	Kylee Muse	458	1.0	+1.0
Angry Victorians	Brendan Taylor	389	0.8	+0.8
Total formal votes		47,153	95.6	–0.4
Informal votes		2,156	4.4	+0.4
Turnout		49,309	89.6	+3.3
Two-party-preferred result
Labor	Alison Marchant	27,567	58.5	−3.0
Liberal	Donnie Grigau	19,586	41.5	+3.0
Labor hold		Swing	−3.0	

Two-party-preferred vote results in Bellarine View source data.
