= Gerard Dowling =

Australian cricketer (born 1964)

Personal information
- Born: 10 November 1964 (age 62); Melbourne, Australia

Domestic team information
- Years: Team
- 1991-1992: Victoria
- Source: Cricinfo, 10 December 2015

Gerard Dowling (born 10 November 1964) is an Australian former cricketer. He played two first-class cricket matches for Victoria between 1991 and 1992.

== See also ==
- List of Victoria first-class cricketers
