= Lisa Neville =

Australian politician (born 1964)

The Honourable Lisa Neville MP

Minister for Police
- In office 23 August 2021 – 27 June 2022
- Premier: Daniel Andrews
- Preceded by: Herself
- Succeeded by: Anthony Carbines
- In office 23 May 2016 – 29 November 2018
- Premier: Daniel Andrews
- Preceded by: Wade Noonan
- Succeeded by: Herself

Minister for Police and Emergency Services
- In office 29 November 2018 – 23 August 2021
- Premier: Daniel Andrews
- Preceded by: Herself (police); James Merlino (emergency services)
- Succeeded by: Herself (police); Jaclyn Symes (emergency services)

Minister for Water (Victoria)
- In office 23 May 2016 – 27 June 2022
- Premier: Daniel Andrews
- Preceded by: Herself
- Succeeded by: Harriet Shing

Minister for Environment, Climate Change and Water
- In office 4 December 2014 – 23 May 2016
- Premier: Daniel Andrews
- Preceded by: Ryan Smith (environment); Peter Walsh (water)
- Succeeded by: Lily D'Ambrosio (environment); Herself (water)

Member of the Victorian Legislative Assembly for Bellarine
- In office 30 November 2002 – 26 November 2022
- Preceded by: Garry Spry
- Succeeded by: Alison Marchant

Personal details
- Born: 27 May 1964 (age 62) Newcastle, New South Wales, Australia
- Party: Labor
- Spouse: Richard Marles (divorced)
- Education: Griffith University (BA, 1986); Deakin University (LLB, 1999)
- Website: www.lisanevillemp.com.au

Lisa Mary Neville (born 27 May 1964) is a former Australian politician, formerly serving as the member for Bellarine in the Victorian Legislative Assembly. She represented the Labor Party. Between 2014 and 2022, she was the Minister for Police and the Minister for Water. She also held other portfolios such as environment, climate change and emergency services at different times during this period.

== Early life and education ==
Neville was born in Newcastle, New South Wales. Her father worked for the airline Qantas, and the family moved around Australia and Papua New Guinea before settling in Brisbane. Neville attended Mount Alvernia College, and then completed an arts degree at Griffith University. At university, she was involved in student unionism, initially with the Queensland Union of Students and then as general secretary and president of the National Union of Students in Melbourne. She worked as a community visitor, inspecting residential facilities for the elderly and disabled on behalf of the state Public Advocate.

== Political career ==
Neville first entered parliament at the 2002 election winning the marginal Liberal seat of Bellarine. After spending her first term on the backbench, she was promoted to the positions of Minister for Mental Health, Minister for Children and Minister for Aged Care after the 2006 election.

Neville was named the Shadow Minister for Environment, Climate Change and the Arts by leader Daniel Andrews following Labor's loss in the 2010 Victorian state election.

Neville was made Minister for Environment and Climate Change and Minister for Water following the victory of the Labor Party at the 2014 Victorian state election.

Following a cabinet reshuffle in May 2016, Neville was appointed as the first female Minister for Police in Victoria, and retained her water portfolio.

In February 2021, Neville was admitted to the hospital and was forced to take leave due to Crohn's disease. She returned to work in August 2021. The nature of her emergency services portfolio required regular travel around to remote parts of the state at short notice, which was difficult given her medical condition, forcing her to relinquish the portfolio.

In June 2022, Neville announced she would retire at the November state election, citing her medical condition. She stepped down from her ministerial role on 27 June 2022, and her term as the member for Bellarine ended on 26 November 2022.

== Personal life ==
Neville was previously married to, and has a son with, Richard Marles, who later became the federal MP for Corio and the Deputy Prime Minister.

Victorian Legislative Assembly
Preceded by Garry Spry	Member for Bellarine; 2002–2022	Succeeded by Alison Marchant
Political offices
Preceded by Ryan Smith as Minister for Environment and Climate Change	Minister for Environment, Climate Change and Water; 2014–2016	Succeeded by Lily D'Ambrosio as Minister for Environment and Climate Change
Preceded by Peter Walsh as Minister for Water	Minister for Environment, Climate Change and Water; 2014–2016	Succeeded by Herself as Minister for Water
Preceded by Herself as Minister for Environment, Climate Change and Water	Minister for Water; 2016–2022	Succeeded by Harriet Shing
Preceded by Wade Noonan	Minister for Police; 2016–2018	Succeeded by Herself as Minister for Police and Emergency Services
Preceded by James Merlino as Minister for Emergency Serviceds	Minister for Police and Emergency Services; 2018–2021	Succeeded by Jaclyn Symes as Minister for Emergency Services
Preceded by Herself as Minister for Police	Minister for Police and Emergency Services; 2018–2021	Succeeded by Herself as Minister for Police
Preceded by Herself as Minister for Police and Emergency Services	Minister for Police; 2021–2022	Succeeded by Anthony Carbines
