= The Road Show =

Canadian music variety show

- Genre: Variety
- Created by: Marv Terhoch
- Country of origin: Canada
- Original language: English
- No. of seasons: 1
- No. of episodes: 4

Production
- Executive producer: Marv Terhoch
- Production location: Winnipeg
- Running time: 60 minutes

Original release
- Network: CBC Television
- Release: 3 June – 24 June 1977

The Road Show is a Canadian music variety show that aired on CBC Television in 1977.

== Premise ==
This program was a mid-season replacement for The Tommy Hunter Show. Colleen Peterson and Rick Neufeld hosted this follow-up four-episode series which was recorded in the Prairie provinces. Regulars included humourist Peter Paul Van Camp and the Prairie Dog Band of which Neufeld was a member.

The program was a spin-off from an episode of the regional CBC program Points West which featured a concert recorded at Winnipeg's Stoney Mountain Penitentiary.

== Scheduling ==
This hour-long program was broadcast Fridays at 9:00 p.m. Eastern from 3 to 24 June 1977.

== Episodes ==
1. Brandon, Manitoba: Ian Tyson and the community's Royal Winter Fair were featured
2. Banff, Alberta: Dick Damron and Len Udow were featured at the School of Fine Arts
3. Shilo, Manitoba: Buck Evans was featured at CFB Shilo
4. Prince Albert, Saskatchewan: Roosevelt Sykes was featured at that community's maximum security jail
