= Patrick J. Dowling =

Irish structural engineer

Patrick Joseph A. Dowling, CBE FRS (23 March 1939 – 28 April 2023) was an Irish engineer and educationalist.

== Early life ==
Patrick Joseph A. Dowling was born in Sandymount, Dublin on 23 March 1939. He was educated at University College Dublin, graduating in 1960 with a degree in civil engineering.

== Career ==
Dowling then went to work at Imperial College London, where in 1986 he was appointed to their chair in structural engineering, which he held for the next 15 years. He was afterwards Vice-Chancellor and Chief Executive of the University of Surrey from October 1994 to his retirement in June 2005.

In 1996, he was elected a Fellow of the Royal Society.

Dowling served as President of the Institution of Structural Engineers (1994–95), Chairman of the Steel Construction Institute, Vice-President of the Royal Academy of Engineering, Chairman of the Engineering Council, President of the Association for Science Education and as Chairman of the British Association for the Advancement of Science. He was appointed Deputy Lieutenant of Surrey in 1999 and appointed a CBE in the New Year Honours List of 2001 "for his contribution to industry/university relations". In 2006 he was awarded the James Alfred Ewing Medal of the Institution of Civil Engineers.

== Personal life and death ==
Dowling was married to Grace Lobo, an Indian from Zanzibar, who in 2004 became the first High Sheriff of Surrey to be appointed from an ethnic minority.

Patrick J. Dowling died on 28 April 2023, at the age of 84.

== Works ==
Dowling co-wrote 6 books on subjects in his field of offshore oil platforms, including:

- "Buckling of shells in offshore structures", by J.E. Harding, Patrick Joseph Dowling and N. Agelidis, Granada, 1982
- "Structural Steel Design", by Dowling, P.J., Knowles, P. and Owens, G.W., Butterworths, London, 1988
