= Richard Dowling (writer) =

Irish novelist

Richard Dowling (3 June 1846 – 28 July 1898) was an Irish novelist, short story writer, and essayist. Some of his works were published under the pseudonym Marcus Fall.

Dowling was born in Clonmel, Tipperary, Ireland in 1846. He worked with a group of Irish writers producing a paper called Zolius. He moved to England and then wrote short stories for London Illustrated News. Building upon the success of his short stories, he wrote his first novel The Mystery of Killard. Many of the stories are set in locations he would have known. The subject is a mixture of detective, crime and mystery.

He lived in Clapham in West London with his wife and three children, Margret, Sarah and David. He died at the age of 52, just as he was becoming known as a popular writer. His books were still published for a number of years after his death.

Copies of the books are kept in the National Library in London and are available online now they have been digitised.

== Works ==
It is understood that Downey (of publisher Ward and Downey) was a cousin.

- The Mystery of Killard: A Novel. 3 vol. London: Tinsley Brothers, 1879.
- Sport of Fate. 3 vol. London: Tinsley Brothers, 1880.
- The Weird Sisters. 3 vol. London: Tinsley Brothers, 1880.
- Under St. Paul's. 3 vol. London: Tinsley Brothers, 1880.
- London Town: Skeches of London Life and Character. 2 vol. London: Tinsley Brothers, 1880. (Originally published under the pseudonym Marcus Fall)
- The Duke's Sweetheart: A Romance. 3 vol. London: Tinsley Brothers, 1881.
- The Husband's Secret. 3 vol. London: Tinsley Brothers, 1881.
- A Sapphire Ring and Other Stories. 3 vol. London: Tinsley Brothers, 1882.
- Sweet Inisfail: A Romance. 3 vol. London: Tinsley Brothers, 1882.
- The Last Call: A Romance. 3 vol. London: Tinsley Brothers, 1884.
- On the Embankment. 1 vol. London: Tinsley Brothers, 1884.
- The Hidden Flame: A Romance. 3 vol. London: Tinsley Brothers, 1885.
- Tempest-Driven. 3 vol. London: Tinsley Brothers, 1886.
- Fatal Bonds: A Romance. 3 vol. London: Ward and Downey, 1886.
- The Skeleton Key: A Story. 1 vol. London: Ward and Downey, 1886.
- With the Unhanged. 1 vol. London: Sonnenschein, 1887.
- Miracle Gold: A Novel. 3 vol. London: Ward and Downey, 1888.
- An Isle of Surrey: A Novel. 3 vol. London: Ward and Downey, 1889.
- A Baffling Quest. 3 vol. London: Ward and Downey, 1891.
- The Crimson Chair and Other Stories. 1 vol. London: Ward and Downey, 1891.
- Catmur's Caves: or, The Quality of Mercy. 1 vol. London: A. and C. Black, 1892.
- A Dark Intruder. 2 vol. London: Downey, 1894.
- Below Bridge. 3 vol. London: Ward and Downey, 1895.
- While London Sleeps. 1 vol. London: Ward and Downey, 1895.
- Old Corcoran's Money. 1 vol. London: Chatto and Windus, 1897.

He also co-wrote The Fate of Fenella with 23 other authors.
