= Alexander Thomson (pioneer) =

Doctor, pastoralist & politician from Victoria Australia born 1800

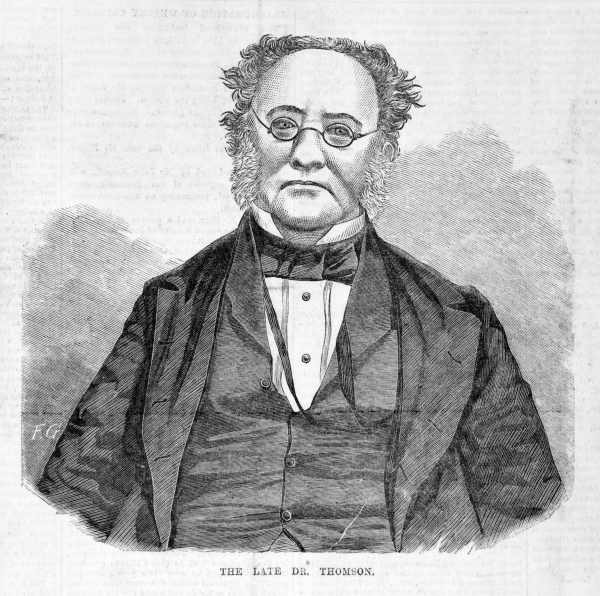
- Dr. Alexander Thomson
- Born: Aberdeen, Scotland
- Baptised: 28 March 1798
- Died: 1 January 1866 (aged 65-66); Geelong, Victoria
- Occupations: Mayor of Geelong

Dr. Alexander Thomson (1800 – 1 January 1866) was elected as the first mayor of Geelong and held the position on five occasions from 1850 to 1858. Thomson was the first settler in the area known as Belmont, a suburb of Geelong and called his homestead Kardinia, a property now listed on the Register of the National Estate.

Thomson was the son of Alexander Thomson, a shipowner of Aberdeen and Margaret Smith, Scotland, baptised 28 March 1798. In March 1824, he married Barbara Dalrymple.

In 1825, Thomson sailed to Tasmania (then Van Diemen's Land) as a surgeon on a convict ship

The suburb of Thomson was named after Dr. Thomson as well as Thomson Street Belmont, the nucleus of the Belmont Heights Estate which was until the first World War, part of his extensive rural property. A parish of the Uniting Church in Australia and the Alexander Thomson Cricket Club, competing in the Geelong Cricket Association, was also named after him.

New South Wales Legislative Council
New creation	Member for Port Phillip; 1 June 1843 – 31 March 1844; With: Thomas Walker; Charles Nicholson; Charles Ebden; John Dunmore Lang	Succeeded by Thomas Mitchell; Adolphus Young (Two vacancies filled)
Victorian Legislative Council
Preceded by Robert Robinson	Member for Geelong; June 1852 – August 1854; With: James Strachan 1852–54; James Cowie 1853–54; Alexander Fyfe 1854	Succeeded by James Harrison
