= Graham Ernst =

Australian politician (1940–2026)

Graham Keith Ernst (16 March 1940 – 26 April 2026) was an Australian trade unionist and politician. He was an Australian Labor Party member of the Parliament of Victoria from 1979 to 1992.

== Biography ==
Ernst was born in Yorketown, South Australia, to Frederick Ernst, a farmer, and Leta Grace Bittner. He attended state schools in Cranbrook and Portland before becoming a fitter and turner at the Portland Superphosphate Works, where he was elected as shop steward for the Amalgamated Metal Workers Union (AMWU). He also worked as the manager of a bakery and operated an engineering workshop in Portland. Heavily involved in the union movement, Ernst was founding junior vice-president of the South West Trades and Labour Council and president of the local branch of the AMWU.

In 1973, Ernst moved to Geelong where he became president of the Geelong branch of the AMWU (now renamed the Amalgamated Metal Workers and Shipwrights Union), and junior vice-president of the Geelong Trades Hall Council. He was elected to the Victorian Legislative Assembly as Labor member for Geelong East at the 1979 Victorian state election, moving to Bellarine in 1985 after the abolition of his former seat. He was defeated at the 1992 state election.

Victorian Legislative Assembly
Preceded by Phil Gude	Member for Geelong East; 1979–1985	Abolished
New seat	Member for Bellarine; 1985–1992	Succeeded by Garry Spry
