= Harley Dickinson =

Australian politician

Harley Rivers Dickinson (20 October 1938 – 4 April 2008) was an Australian politician.

Dickinson was born in the Melbourne suburb of Richmond to Rivers Arthur Dickinson, a solicitor, and Dolina Marion Arbuckle. He attended Croydon State School and then The Geelong College, and graduated from the Australian School of Pacific Administration. He was part of a pioneer expedition to Mount Fubilan in Papua New Guinea in June 1958, and was an officer in the department of the Administrator of Papua and New Guinea until 1970.

On 28 November 1964, he married Nicola Charlotte Nina Payne, with whom he had four children. In 1976, he returned to Australia to become assistant secretary of the Victorian Chamber of Manufacturers, farming at Bannockburn. In 1982, Dickinson was elected to the Victorian Legislative Assembly as the Liberal member for South Barwon.

He resigned from the Liberal Party on 20 May 1992, and contested that year's election as an independent, but was defeated.
