= John Henry Brooke =

Australian politician

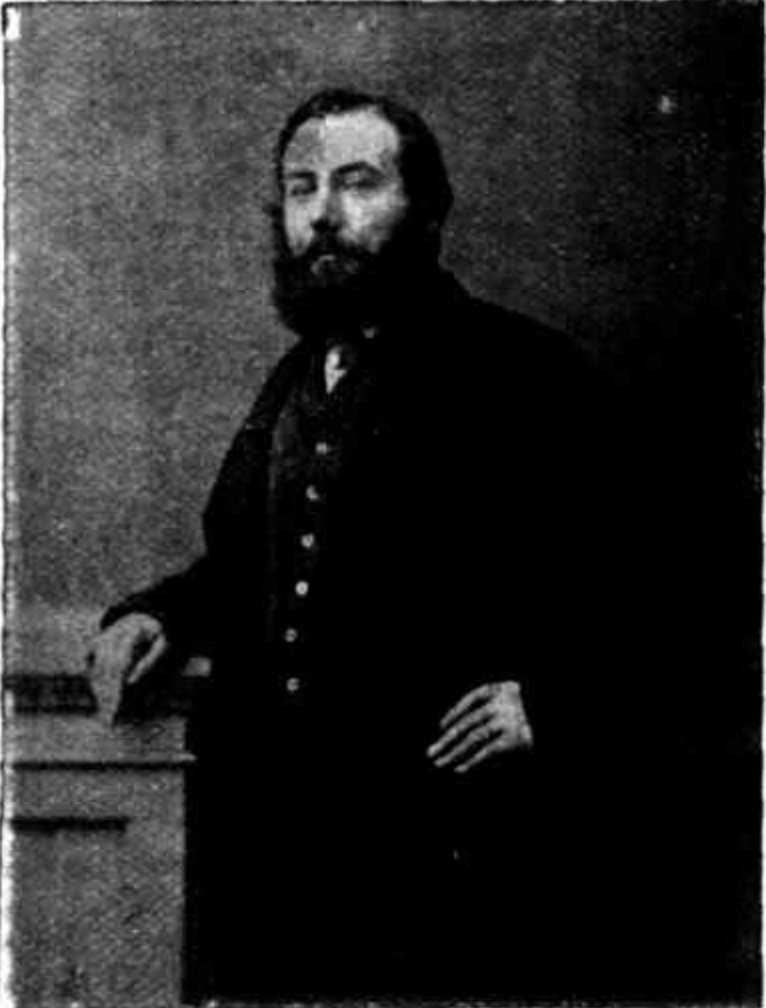
John Henry Brooke

Hon. John Henry Brooke MLA (15 May 1826 – 8 January 1902), was a colonial Victorian politician.

== Personal information ==
Brooke was born at Boston, Lincolnshire on 15 May 1826 the son of John Brooke, a journalist and Mary Ann. He was apprenticed to a printer; became editor and manager of the Lincolnshire Times. He arrived Melbourne in 1852–1853 where he became a reporter at the Melbourne Morning Herald subsequently a contractor for supplies to Legislative Council Club; superintendent of works Vic. Exhibition 1854; suggested and managed refreshment rooms at stations of Hobson's Bay Railway Company.

== Career ==
He was elected to Legislative Assembly of Victoria for the electoral district of Geelong in November 1856 and held it until August 1859, then in the electoral district of Geelong West from October 1859 to August 1864. He was Commissioner of Crown Lands in Victoria under the Heales administration from November 1860 to November 1861, and remembered in connection with the land system of that colony. In 1857, as a member of the Assembly, he was prominent in opposition to the Haines Land Bill, which proposed giving annual licences to the squatters. On his own accession to office he, in conjunction with his colleagues Mr. J. M. Grant and Mr. Ireland, the Attorney-General, brought into operation the famous licences to occupy the waste lands of the Crown, which formed the basis of popular settlement for cultivation purposes on the public lands of Victoria. The scheme was formulated by a mere Gazette notice, the issue of which was formally censured by the Legislative Council. As the result of a dissolution of the Assembly Mr. Brooke's policy was approved by the country, and formed the subject of express eulogy in the Governor's opening speech to the new Parliament in August 1861. The occupation licences were approved by the new Assembly and again condemned by the Council, who denounced the introduction of the new departure by a mere departmental regulation as a breach of the principles of responsible government. The Governor regretted the disapprobation of the Council, but when they entreated that the legality of the licences might be tested in the Supreme Court, replied that his advisers were "satisfied of their legality." He again nominated for the seat in 1864 though withdrew.

He left for Japan in 1867 where he became editor and proprietor of the Japan Daily Herald, one of the first foreign newspapers in Japan.

== Family ==
He married Harriet Williamson in 1849, and there were three sons and three daughters to the marriage. One son was the painter Edmund Walpole Brooke (1865–1938). His daughter Julia was the wife of Spanish diplomat Emilio de Ojeda y Perpiñán, mother of diplomat Gonzalo de Ojeda y Brooke, and grandmother of diplomat Jaime de Ojeda y Eiseley. Through his daughter Gertrude, his grandson was Alfred Brooke-Smith. His granddaughter Gertrude Georgina Cook, through his daughter Mabel, married diplomat Sir Herbert Phillips.
