= George Board =

American baseball player

- First baseman
- Born: October 6, 1880; Shelby County, Kentucky, U.S.
- Died: January 5, 1962 (aged 81); Indianapolis, Indiana, U.S.

Negro league baseball debut
- 1907, for the Indianapolis ABCs

Last appearance
- 1913, for the Indianapolis ABCs

Teams
- Indianapolis ABCs (1907–1913)

George L. Board (October 6, 1880 – January 5, 1962) was an American Negro league first baseman in the 1900s and 1910s.

A native of Shelby County, Kentucky, Board made his Negro leagues debut with the Indianapolis ABCs in 1907. He went on to play seven seasons with Indianapolis through 1913. Board died in Indianapolis, Indiana in 1962 at age 81.
