= Electoral results for the district of Gippsland West =

Australian district election results

This is a list of electoral results for the district of Gippsland West in Victorian state elections.

== Members for Gippsland West ==
First incarnation (1889–1976)
Member	Party	Term
Arthur Groom	None	1889–1892
George Turner	None	1892–1900
Arthur Nichols	Ministerialist/Independent	1900–1902
John Mackey	Ministerialist	1902–1909
John Mackey	Commonwealth Liberal	1909–1917
John Mackey	Nationalist	1917–1924
Arthur Walter	Country	1924–1929
Matthew Bennett	Country	1929–1950
Leslie Cochrane	Country	1950–1970
Rob Maclellan	Liberal	1970–1976
Second incarnation (1985–2002)
Member	Party	Term
Alan Brown	Liberal	1985–1996
Susan Davies	Independent	1997–2002

== Election results ==
=== Elections in the 1990s ===
==== 1999 ====
1999 Victorian state election: Gippsland West
Party	Candidate	Votes	%	±%
Liberal	Gerard McRae	11,502	38.0	−19.8
Independent	Susan Davies	10,819	35.7	+35.7
Labor	Pauline Taylor	5,487	18.1	−15.1
National	Wesley Head	1,973	6.5	+6.5
Independent	Mike Lowry	385	1.3	−7.7
Natural Law	Martin Richardson	128	0.4	+0.4
Total formal votes		30,294	97.4	−0.9
Informal votes		821	2.6	+0.9
Turnout		31,115	94.9	
Two-party-preferred result
Liberal	Gerard McRae	17,095	56.4	−6.2
Labor	Pauline Taylor	13,199	43.6	+6.2
Two-candidate-preferred result
Independent	Susan Davies	16,360	54.0	+54.0
Liberal	Gerard McRae	13,934	46.0	−16.6
Independent gain from Liberal		Swing	+54.0	

==== 1997 by-election ====
1997 Gippsland West state by-election
Party	Candidate	Votes	%	±%
Liberal	Matthew Coleman	11,214	41.4	−16.4
Independent	Susan Davies	8,844	32.6	−0.6 (Note: Compared to results as a Labor Party candidate at the 1996 election.)
Reform	Ray Mathieson	2,555	9.4	+9.4
Independent	Mike Lowry	1,867	6.9	−2.1
Independent	David Turnbull	1,361	5.0	+5.0
Shooters	Neville Sayers	1,275	4.7	+4.7
Total formal votes		27,116	97.5	−0.8
Informal votes		708	2.5	+0.8
Turnout		27,824	88.7	−6.6
Two-candidate-preferred result
Independent	Susan Davies	13,606	50.3	+12.9
Liberal	Matthew Coleman	13,447	49.7	−12.9
Independent gain from Liberal		Swing	+12.9	

==== 1996 ====
1996 Victorian state election: Gippsland West
Party	Candidate	Votes	%	±%
Liberal	Alan Brown	16,944	57.7	−7.5
Labor	Susan Davies	9,755	33.2	+3.7
Independent	Mike Lowry	2,646	9.0	+9.0
Total formal votes		29,345	98.3	+0.9
Informal votes		513	1.7	−0.9
Turnout		29,858	95.2	
Two-party-preferred result
Liberal	Alan Brown	18,356	62.6	−5.3
Labor	Susan Davies	10,956	37.4	+5.3
Liberal hold		Swing	−5.3	

==== 1992 ====
1992 Victorian state election: Gippsland West
Party	Candidate	Votes	%	±%
Liberal	Alan Brown	18,000	65.3	+13.6
Labor	Anwyn Martin	8,158	29.6	−6.9
Natural Law	Trevor Witt	1,424	5.2	+5.2
Total formal votes		27,582	97.4	−0.5
Informal votes		738	2.6	+0.5
Turnout		28,320	96.0	
Two-party-preferred result
Liberal	Alan Brown	18,700	67.9	+5.5
Labor	Anwyn Martin	8,847	32.1	−5.5
Liberal hold		Swing	+5.5	

=== Elections in the 1980s ===
==== 1988 ====
1988 Victorian state election: Gippsland West
Party	Candidate	Votes	%	±%
Liberal	Alan Brown	16,670	52.57	+3.28
Labor	Anwyn Martin	11,539	36.39	+0.47
National	Philip Westwood	3,500	11.04	−3.75
Total formal votes		31,709	97.65	−0.59
Informal votes		762	2.35	+0.59
Turnout		32,471	93.74	−1.03
Two-party-preferred result
Liberal	Alan Brown	19,832	62.58	+0.48
Labor	Anwyn Martin	11,859	37.42	−0.48
Liberal hold		Swing	+0.48	

==== 1985 ====
1985 Victorian state election: Gippsland West
Party	Candidate	Votes	%	±%
Liberal	Alan Brown	14,561	49.3	−0.8
Labor	Geoffrey Bull	10,611	35.9	−0.5
National	William Ronald	4,368	14.8	+11.2
Total formal votes		29,540	98.2	
Informal votes		529	1.8	
Turnout		30,069	94.8	
Two-party-preferred result
Liberal	Alan Brown	18,343	62.1	+2.0
Labor	Geoffrey Bull	11,196	37.9	−2.0
Liberal hold		Swing	+2.0	

=== Elections in the 1970s ===
==== 1973 ====
1973 Victorian state election: Gippsland West
Party	Candidate	Votes	%	±%
Liberal	Rob Maclellan	8,780	45.6	+10.8
Labor	Miles Cahill	5,812	30.2	+0.5
Country	William Belfrage	2,114	11.0	−13.1
Democratic Labor	Noel Gleeson	1,285	6.7	−4.7
Country	Hugh Hendry	1,254	6.5	+6.5
Total formal votes		19,245	97.5	−0.2
Informal votes		485	2.5	+0.2
Turnout		19,730	94.5	−0.9
Two-party-preferred result
Liberal	Rob Maclellan	13,052	67.8	+15.2
Labor	Miles Cahill	6,193	32.2	−15.2
Liberal hold		Swing	+15.2	

==== 1970 ====
1970 Victorian state election: Gippsland West
Party	Candidate	Votes	%	±%
Liberal	Rob Maclellan	6,066	34.8	+8.4
Labor	James Hudson	5,162	29.7	+3.9
Country	Robert Anderson	4,195	24.1	−10.8
Democratic Labor	Michael Houlihan	1,982	11.4	−0.5
Total formal votes		17,405	97.7	+0.5
Informal votes		407	2.3	−0.5
Turnout		17,812	95.4	−0.2
Two-party-preferred result
Liberal	Rob Maclellan	9,161	52.6	+16.0
Labor	James Hudson	8,244	47.4	+47.4
Liberal gain from Country		Swing	N/A	

=== Elections in the 1960s ===
==== 1967 ====
1967 Victorian state election: Gippsland West
Party	Candidate	Votes	%	±%
Country	Leslie Cochrane	5,862	34.9	−0.6
Liberal	Harry Marson	4,436	26.4	+0.8
Labor	Alastair MacKillop	4,337	25.8	0.0
Democratic Labor	Michael Houlihan	2,005	11.9	+0.4
Independent	Peter Milner	147	0.9	+0.9
Total formal votes		16,787	97.2	
Informal votes		491	2.8	
Turnout		17,278	95.6	
Two-party-preferred result
Country	Leslie Cochrane	11,882	71.0	+9.5
Labor	Alastair MacKillop	4,905	29.0	+29.0
Two-candidate-preferred result
Country	Leslie Cochrane	10,298	61.4	−0.1
Liberal	Harry Marson	6,489	38.6	+0.1
Country hold		Swing	−0.1	

==== 1964 ====
1964 Victorian state election: Gippsland West
Party	Candidate	Votes	%	±%
Country	Leslie Cochrane	8,939	41.8	+2.2
Liberal and Country	Harry Marson	5,054	23.6	+2.1
Labor	Donald McLeod	4,814	22.5	−2.7
Democratic Labor	Kevin Scanlon	2,592	12.1	−1.6
Total formal votes		21,339	98.0	+0.4
Informal votes		442	2.0	−0.4
Turnout		21,841	95.5	+0.4
Two-party-preferred result
Country	Leslie Cochrane	15,691	73.3	−0.3
Labor	Donald McLeod	5,708	26.7	+0.3
Two-candidate-preferred result
Country	Leslie Cochrane	13,813	64.6	−9.0
Liberal and Country	Harry Marson	7,586	35.4	+35.4
Country hold		Swing	−9.0	

==== 1961 ====
1961 Victorian state election: Gippsland West
Party	Candidate	Votes	%	±%
Country	Leslie Cochrane	8,224	39.6	−2.9
Labor	Eric Kent	5,237	25.2	−0.8
Liberal and Country	Toni Garside	4,463	21.5	+1.8
Democratic Labor	Kevin Scanlon	2,847	13.7	+1.9
Total formal votes		20,771	97.6	−0.9
Informal votes		508	2.4	+0.9
Turnout		21,279	95.1	−0.2
Two-party-preferred result
Country	Leslie Cochrane	15,284	73.6	+3.2
Labor	Eric Kent	5,487	26.4	−3.2
Country hold		Swing	+3.2	

=== Elections in the 1950s ===
==== 1958 ====
1958 Victorian state election: Gippsland West
Party	Candidate	Votes	%	±%
Country	Leslie Cochrane	8,738	42.5	
Labor	James Longstaff	5,340	26.0	
Liberal and Country	James Hosking	4,050	19.7	
Democratic Labor	Kevin Scanlon	2,437	11.8	
Total formal votes		20,585	98.5	
Informal votes		309	1.5	
Turnout		20,894	95.3	
Two-party-preferred result
Country	Leslie Cochrane	14,502	70.4	
Labor	James Longstaff	6,083	29.6	
Country hold		Swing		

==== 1955 ====
1955 Victorian state election: Gippsland West
Party	Candidate	Votes	%	±%
Country	Leslie Cochrane	12,419	58.9	
Liberal and Country	Colin Ferres	6,938	32.9	
Communist	Walter Doig	1,716	8.2	
Total formal votes		21,073	97.4	
Informal votes		552	2.6	
Turnout		21,625	94.5	
Two-candidate-preferred result
Country	Leslie Cochrane	13,277	63.0	
Liberal and Country	Colin Ferres	7,796	37.0	
Country hold		Swing		

==== 1952 ====
1952 Victorian state election: Gippsland West
Party	Candidate	Votes	%	±%
Country	Leslie Cochrane	6,989	45.3	+3.6
Labor	Thomas Holland	5,574	36.2	+36.2
Liberal and Country	Mac Steward	2,857	18.5	−22.6
Total formal votes		15,420	98.6	+0.9
Informal votes		215	1.4	−0.9
Turnout		15,635	94.2	+0.3
Two-party-preferred result
Country	Leslie Cochrane	9,293	60.3	+6.9
Labor	Thomas Holland	6,127	39.7	+39.7
Country hold		Swing	N/A	

==== 1950 ====
1950 Victorian state election: Gippsland West
Party	Candidate	Votes	%	±%
Country	Leslie Cochrane	6,137	41.8	−4.7
Liberal and Country	Basil Morris	6,047	41.1	+12.8
Independent	Mac Steward	2,517	17.1	+17.1
Total formal votes		14,701	97.7	−1.5
Informal votes		349	2.3	+1.5
Turnout		15,050	93.9	+0.7
Two-candidate-preferred result
Country	Leslie Cochrane	7,844	53.4	−3.4
Liberal and Country	Basil Morris	6,857	46.6	+3.4
Country hold		Swing	−3.4	

=== Elections in the 1940s ===
==== 1947 ====
1947 Victorian state election: Gippsland West
Party	Candidate	Votes	%	±%
Country	Matthew Bennett	6,636	46.5	−7.4
Liberal	Basil Morris	4,047	28.3	+28.3
Labor	Fred Rush	3,599	25.2	−7.3
Total formal votes		14,282	99.2	+0.7
Informal votes		121	0.8	−0.7
Turnout		14,403	93.2	+5.4
Two-candidate-preferred result
Country	Matthew Bennett	8,118	56.8	
Liberal	Basil Morris	6,164	43.2	
Country hold		Swing	N/A	

==== 1945 ====
1945 Victorian state election: Gippsland West
Party	Candidate	Votes	%	±%
Country	Matthew Bennett	6,707	53.9	
Labor	Robert Baker	4,044	32.5	
Independent	George Calderwood	1,687	13.6	
Total formal votes		12,438	98.5	
Informal votes		193	1.5	
Turnout		12,631	87.8	
Country hold		Swing		

==== 1943 ====
1943 Victorian state election: Gippsland West
Party	Candidate	Votes	%	±%
Country	Matthew Bennett	6,949	67.9	−32.1
Independent	Ernest Watkin	2,279	22.3	+22.3
Independent	Bartholomew Goulding	1,013	9.9	+9.9
Total formal votes		10,241	97.6	
Informal votes		255	2.4	
Turnout		10,496	87.0	
Country hold		Swing	N/A	

==== 1940 ====
1940 Victorian state election: Gippsland West
Party	Candidate	Votes	%	±%
Country	Matthew Bennett	7,086	68.2	−31.8
Liberal Country	Clement McCrostie	1,676	16.2	+16.2
Independent	Harold Edwards	1,630	15.7	+15.7
Total formal votes		10,392	97.7	
Informal votes		244	2.3	
Turnout		10,636	92.9	
Country hold		Swing	N/A	

- Preferences were not distributed.

=== Elections in the 1930s ===
==== 1937 ====
1937 Victorian state election: Gippsland West
Party	Candidate	Votes	%	±%
Country	Matthew Bennett	unopposed		
Country hold		Swing		

==== 1935 ====
1935 Victorian state election: Gippsland West
Party	Candidate	Votes	%	±%
Country	Matthew Bennett	7,861	74.2	−25.8
Independent	George Burhop	2,739	25.8	+25.8
Total formal votes		10,600	98.3	
Informal votes		183	1.7	
Turnout		10,783	94.4	
Country hold		Swing	N/A	

==== 1932 ====
1932 Victorian state election: Gippsland West
Party	Candidate	Votes	%	±%
Country	Matthew Bennett	unopposed		
Country hold		Swing		

=== Elections in the 1920s ===
==== 1929 ====
1929 Victorian state election: Gippsland West
Party	Candidate	Votes	%	±%
Country	Matthew Bennett	3,688	37.5	+14.9
Labor	Robert Garlick	3,447	35.1	−1.9
Nationalist	Reginald James	2,698	27.4	+7.2
Total formal votes		9,833	99.0	+2.7
Informal votes		102	1.0	−2.7
Turnout		9,935	93.8	+2.3
Two-party-preferred result
Country	Matthew Bennett	6,080	61.8	+9.1
Labor	Robert Garlick	3,753	38.2	−9.1
Country hold		Swing	+9.1	

==== 1929 by-election ====
1929 Gippsland West state by-election
Party	Candidate	Votes	%	±%
Labor	Thomas Houlihan	3,933	43.0	+5.8
Country	Matthew Bennett	2,658	29.0	+6.4
Nationalist	Reginald James	2,559	28.0	+7.2
Total formal votes		9,150	99.0	+2.7
Informal votes		82	1.0	−2.7
Turnout		9,232	89.9	−1.6
Two-party-preferred result
Country	Matthew Bennett	5,034	55.0	+2.3
Labor	Thomas Houlihan	4,116	45.0	−2.3
Country hold		Swing	+2.3	

==== 1927 ====
1927 Victorian state election: Gippsland West
Party	Candidate	Votes	%	±%
Labor	Thomas Houlihan	3,299	37.2	
Country	Arthur Walter	2,006	22.6	
Nationalist	James Wilson	1,793	20.2	
Independent	Arthur a'Beckett	768	8.7	
Country Progressive	John Dowd	579	6.5	
Australian Liberal	Robert Garlick	424	4.8	
Total formal votes		8,869	96.3	
Informal votes		339	3.7	
Turnout		9,208	91.5	
Two-party-preferred result
Country	Arthur Walter	4,673	52.7	
Labor	Thomas Houlihan	4,196	47.3	
Country hold		Swing		

==== 1924 ====
1924 Victorian state election: Gippsland West
Party	Candidate	Votes	%	±%
Country	Arthur Walter	2,830	47.6	+47.6
Nationalist	Ernest Bremner	1,602	27.0	−73.0
Labor	John McKellar	1,510	25.4	+25.4
Total formal votes		5,942	99.1	
Informal votes		53	0.9	
Turnout		5,995	63.9	
Two-candidate-preferred result
Country	Arthur Walter	3,966	66.8	+66.8
Nationalist	Ernest Bremner	1,976	33.2	−66.8
Country gain from Nationalist		Swing	N/A	

==== 1924 by-election ====
1924 Gippsland West state by-election
Party	Candidate	Votes	%	±%
Country	Arthur Walter	1,683	34.5	
Nationalist	Ernest Bremner	1,251	25.7	
Labor	John McKellar	1,175	24.1	
Ind. Nationalist	John Campbell	555	11.4	
Independent Country	John McQueen	208	4.3	
Total formal votes		5,015	97.2	
Informal votes		143	2.8	
Turnout		5,158	53.3	
Two-candidate-preferred result
Country	Arthur Walter	3,094	63.5	
Nationalist	Ernest Bremner	1,788	36.5	
Country gain from Nationalist		Swing	N/A	

==== 1921 ====
1921 Victorian state election: Gippsland West
Party	Candidate	Votes	%	±%
Nationalist	John Mackey	unopposed		
Nationalist hold		Swing		

==== 1920 ====
1920 Victorian state election: Gippsland West
Party	Candidate	Votes	%	±%
Nationalist	John Mackey	unopposed		
Nationalist hold		Swing		

=== Elections in the 1910s ===
==== 1917 ====
1917 Victorian state election: Gippsland West
Party	Candidate	Votes	%	±%
Nationalist	John Mackey	unopposed		
Nationalist hold		Swing		

==== 1914 ====
1914 Victorian state election: Gippsland West
Party	Candidate	Votes	%	±%
Liberal	John Mackey	unopposed		
Liberal hold		Swing		

==== 1911 ====
1911 Victorian state election: Gippsland West
Party	Candidate	Votes	%	±%
Liberal	John Mackey	3,229	65.9	N/A
Labor	Ebenezer Brown	972	19.8	+19.8
Independent Liberal	Hugh Copeland	701	14.3	+14.3
Total formal votes		4,902	98.5	
Informal votes		77	1.5	
Turnout		4,979	61.1	
Two-party-preferred result
Liberal	John Mackey		78.8	
Labor	Ebenezer Brown		21.2	
Liberal hold		Swing	N/A	

- Two party preferred vote was estimated.
