= 1997 Gippsland West state by-election =

- 1 February 1997

Electoral district of Gippsland West in the Victorian Legislative Assembly
- Registered: 31,375
- Turnout: 88.7% (▼6.6)
	First party	Second party
		IND
Candidate	Matthew Coleman	Susan Davies
Party	Liberal	Independent
Primary vote	11,214	8,844
Percentage	41.4%	32.6%
Swing	▼16.4	▼0.6 (Note: Compared to results as a Labor Party candidate at the 1996 election.)
TCP	49.7%	50.3%
TCP swing	▼12.9	▲12.9
MP before election
Alan Brown
Liberal
Elected MP
Susan Davies
Independent

The 1997 Gippsland West state by-election was held on 1 February 1997 to elect the member for Gippsland West in the Victorian Legislative Assembly, following the resignation of Liberal Party MP Alan Brown.

Brown, who served as Liberal leader from 1989 until 1991, resigned on 31 December 1966 after being appointed by the Kennett government as the Agent General for Victoria. At the time, his seat was the second-safest for the Liberals in Victoria.

Susan Davies, who contested Gippsland West for the Labor Party at the 1996 state election, nominated as an independent candidate after Labor chose not to contest. She won the seat after a 12.9% two-candidate-preferred vote swing against the Liberals, helped by the preferences of other independent and minor party voters.

The result was a significant defeat for premier Jeff Kennett and his government, and was the first of two by-election losses it experienced in 1997 (the other being Mitcham in December). Davies was re-elected at the 1999 state election and subsequently played a decisive role in defeating the Kennett government by supporting a minority Labor government led by Steve Bracks.

== Candidates ==
Candidates are listed in the order they appeared on the ballot. This was the first election contested by the Australian Reform Party after its formation in May 1996.

Party	Candidate	Background
Independent	Susan Davies	Labor candidate for Gippsland West in 1996
Shooters	Neville Sayers	Olympian sports shooter
Independent	David Turnbull	
Reform	Ray Mathieson	Farmer and former policeman
Independent	Mike Lowry	Publican and independent candidate for Gippsland West in 1996
Liberal	Matthew Coleman	

== Results ==
1997 Gippsland West state by-election
Party	Candidate	Votes	%	±%
Liberal	Matthew Coleman	11,214	41.4	−16.4
Independent	Susan Davies	8,844	32.6	−0.6
Reform	Ray Mathieson	2,555	9.4	+9.4
Independent	Mike Lowry	1,867	6.9	−2.1
Independent	David Turnbull	1,361	5.0	+5.0
Shooters	Neville Sayers	1,275	4.7	+4.7
Total formal votes		27,116	97.5	−0.8
Informal votes		708	2.5	+0.8
Turnout		27,824	88.7	−6.6
Two-candidate-preferred result
Independent	Susan Davies	13,606	50.3	+12.9
Liberal	Matthew Coleman	13,447	49.7	−12.9
Independent gain from Liberal		Swing	+12.9	

== See also ==
- Electoral results for the district of Gippsland West
- List of Victorian state by-elections
