= Electoral results for the district of Berwick =

Victoria, Australia, district election results

This is a list of electoral results for the electoral district of Berwick in Victorian state elections.

== Members for Berwick ==
Member	Party	Term
Rob Maclellan	Liberal	1976–1992
Robert Dean	Liberal	1992–2002

== Election results ==
=== Elections in the 2020s ===
2022 Victorian state election: Berwick
Party	Candidate	Votes	%	±%
Liberal	Brad Battin	20,031	45.2	−2.6
Labor	Malik Zaveer	15,874	35.8	−6.6
Greens	Hayley Perry	4,297	9.7	+2.4
Freedom	Kerry Haupt	1,570	3.5	+3.5
Family First	Joel van der Horst	1,488	3.4	+3.4
Animal Justice	Katherine Dolheguy	1,029	2.3	+2.3
Total formal votes		44,288	95.9	+1.7
Informal votes		1,876	4.1	−1.7
Turnout		46,164	88.9	+0.2
Two-party-preferred result
Liberal	Brad Battin	24,230	54.7	+3.4
Labor	Malik Zaveer	20,058	45.3	−3.4
Liberal hold		Swing	+3.4	

=== Elections in the 1990s ===
1999 Victorian state election: Berwick
Party	Candidate	Votes	%	±%
Liberal	Robert Dean	21,958	53.9	+0.8
Labor	Philip Reed	17,248	42.4	−0.3
Democratic Labor	Michael Rowe	1,519	3.7	+3.7
Total formal votes		40,725	97.0	−0.4
Informal votes		1,241	3.0	+0.4
Turnout		41,966	94.4	
Two-party-preferred result
Liberal	Robert Dean	22,376	54.9	−0.4
Labor	Philip Reed	18,348	45.1	+0.4
Liberal hold		Swing	−0.4	

1996 Victorian state election: Berwick
Party	Candidate	Votes	%	±%
Liberal	Robert Dean	19,105	53.2	+2.7
Labor	Jean Lyon	15,342	42.7	+5.8
Call to Australia	David Gleeson	1,487	4.1	+4.1
Total formal votes		35,934	97.5	+1.7
Informal votes		939	2.5	−1.7
Turnout		36,873	95.0	
Two-party-preferred result
Liberal	Robert Dean	19,858	55.3	−1.7
Labor	Jean Lyon	16,060	44.7	+1.7
Liberal hold		Swing	−1.7	

1992 Victorian state election: Berwick
Party	Candidate	Votes	%	±%
Liberal	Robert Dean	14,750	50.5	+5.5
Labor	Rob Jolly	10,786	36.9	−16.7
Independent	John Hastie	1,877	6.4	+6.4
Independent	Lynne Dickson	1,295	4.4	+4.4
Independent	Steve Maloney	491	1.7	+1.7
Total formal votes		29,199	95.8	+1.1
Informal votes		1,284	4.2	−1.1
Turnout		30,483	95.9	
Two-party-preferred result
Liberal	Robert Dean	16,512	57.0	+11.6
Labor	Rob Jolly	12,459	43.0	−11.6
Liberal gain from Labor		Swing	+11.6	

=== Elections in the 1980s ===
1988 Victorian state election: Berwick
Party	Candidate	Votes	%	±%
Liberal	Rob Maclellan	16,777	49.49	−3.61
Labor	Philip Huggins	14,593	43.05	−3.85
Democrats	Jyan Mayfield	2,530	7.46	+7.46
Total formal votes		33,900	97.37	−0.29
Informal votes		915	2.63	+0.29
Turnout		34,815	93.21	−0.78
Two-party-preferred result
Liberal	Rob Maclellan	17,425	51.40	−1.70
Labor	Philip Huggins	16,475	48.60	+1.70
Liberal hold		Swing	−1.70	

1985 Victorian state election: Berwick
Party	Candidate	Votes	%	±%
Liberal	Rob Maclellan	15,144	53.1	+0.8
Labor	Philip Staindl	13,378	46.9	−0.8
Total formal votes		28,522	97.7	
Informal votes		684	2.3	
Turnout		29,206	94.0	
Liberal hold		Swing	+0.8	

1982 Victorian state election: Berwick
Party	Candidate	Votes	%	±%
Liberal	Rob Maclellan	18,621	51.2	−1.8
Labor	Philip Staindl	17,732	48.8	+11.0
Total formal votes		36,353	97.4	−0.2
Informal votes		965	2.6	+0.2
Turnout		37,318	93.8	+0.7
Liberal hold		Swing	−7.0	

=== Elections in the 1970s ===
1979 Victorian state election: Berwick
Party	Candidate	Votes	%	±%
Liberal	Rob Maclellan	15,942	53.0	+2.9
Labor	Judith Wallace	11,383	37.8	+4.5
Democrats	Grace Bayliss	2,754	9.2	+9.2
Total formal votes		30,079	97.6	−0.7
Informal votes		738	2.4	+0.7
Turnout		30,817	93.1	+1.0
Two-party-preferred result
Liberal	Rob Maclellan	17,509	58.2	−6.9
Labor	Judith Wallace	12,570	41.8	+6.9
Liberal hold		Swing	−6.9	

1976 Victorian state election: Berwick
Party	Candidate	Votes	%	±%
Liberal	Rob Maclellan	12,454	50.1	−2.9
Labor	Judith Wallace	8,272	33.3	−0.9
National	Ronald Irwin	2,844	11.4	+6.4
Democratic Labor	Michael Houlihan	1,303	5.2	−1.9
Total formal votes		24,873	98.3	
Informal votes		439	1.7	
Turnout		25,312	92.1	
Two-party-preferred result
Liberal	Rob Maclellan	16,187	65.1	+1.3
Labor	Judith Wallace	8,686	34.9	−1.3
Liberal hold		Swing	+1.3	
