= John Mackey (politician) =

Australian politician

Sir John Mackey
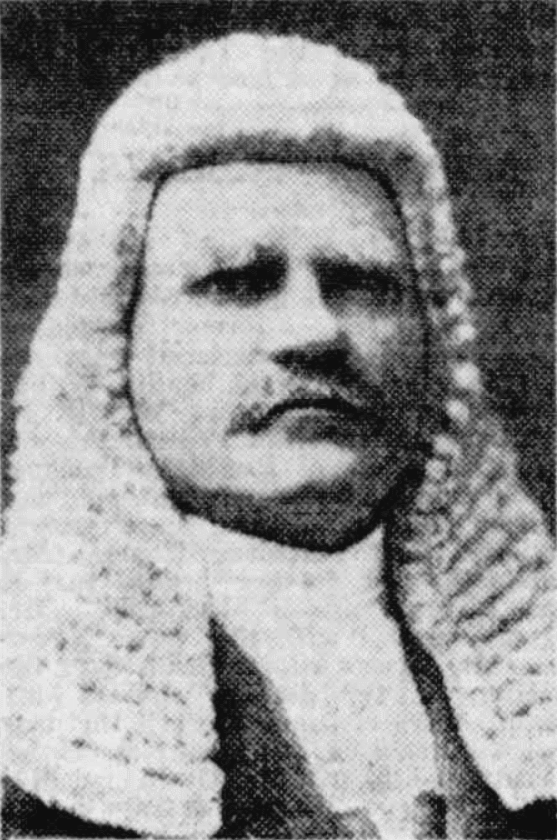

12th Speaker of the Victorian Legislative Assembly
- In office 29 November 1917 – 6 April 1924
- Preceded by: Frank Madden
- Succeeded by: John Bowser

Solicitor-General of Victoria
- In office 28 February 1908 – 8 September 1908
- Preceded by: John Mark Davies
- Succeeded by: John Mark Davies

Member of the Victorian Legislative Assembly for Gippsland West
- In office 1902–1924
- Preceded by: Arthur Nichols
- Succeeded by: Arthur Walter

Personal details
- Born: 7 August 1863 Sandhurst, Victoria, Australia
- Died: 6 April 1924 (aged 60) Nayook, Victoria, Australia

Sir John Emanuel Mackey (7 August 1863 – 6 April 1924) was an Australian politician. Mackey was born in Sandhurst to horse dealer David Mackey and Mary Ann Moore. He was largely self-educated, with only a brief and late formal education. He worked at a printery in Bendigo and then as a compositor for Mason, Firth and McCutcheon, a Melbourne law firm. He studied law at the University of Melbourne where he was resident at Ormond College, receiving a Bachelor of Law and a Master of Arts. In 1890 he was called to the bar, and he was also a lecturer at Melbourne University. In 1902 he married Stella Watson Bates, with whom he had five children.

Mackey was elected to the Victorian Legislative Assembly in 1902 for Gippsland West, and soon entered the ministry as a minister without portfolio in 1904. From 1906 he was Minister of Lands; he was also briefly Chief Secretary and Minister of Labour from 1906 to 1907 before taking up these roles again in 1908. From February to September 1908 he was Solicitor-General of Victoria. A Liberal and a member of the Nationalist Party's Economy faction, he was Speaker of the Assembly from 1917 to 1924. Knighted in 1921, he died at Nayook in 1924.

Acacia mackeyana was named in his honour, in recognition of his services towards the establishment of Wilson's Promontory National Park.

Victorian Legislative Assembly
| Preceded by Arthur Nichols | Member for Gippsland West; 1902–1924 | Succeeded by Arthur Walter |
Political offices
| Preceded by Sir Frank Madden | Speaker of the Victorian Legislative Assembly; 1917–1924 | Succeeded by John Bowser |
| Preceded by John Davies | Solicitor-General of Victoria; Feb – Sep 1908 | Succeeded by John Davies |
