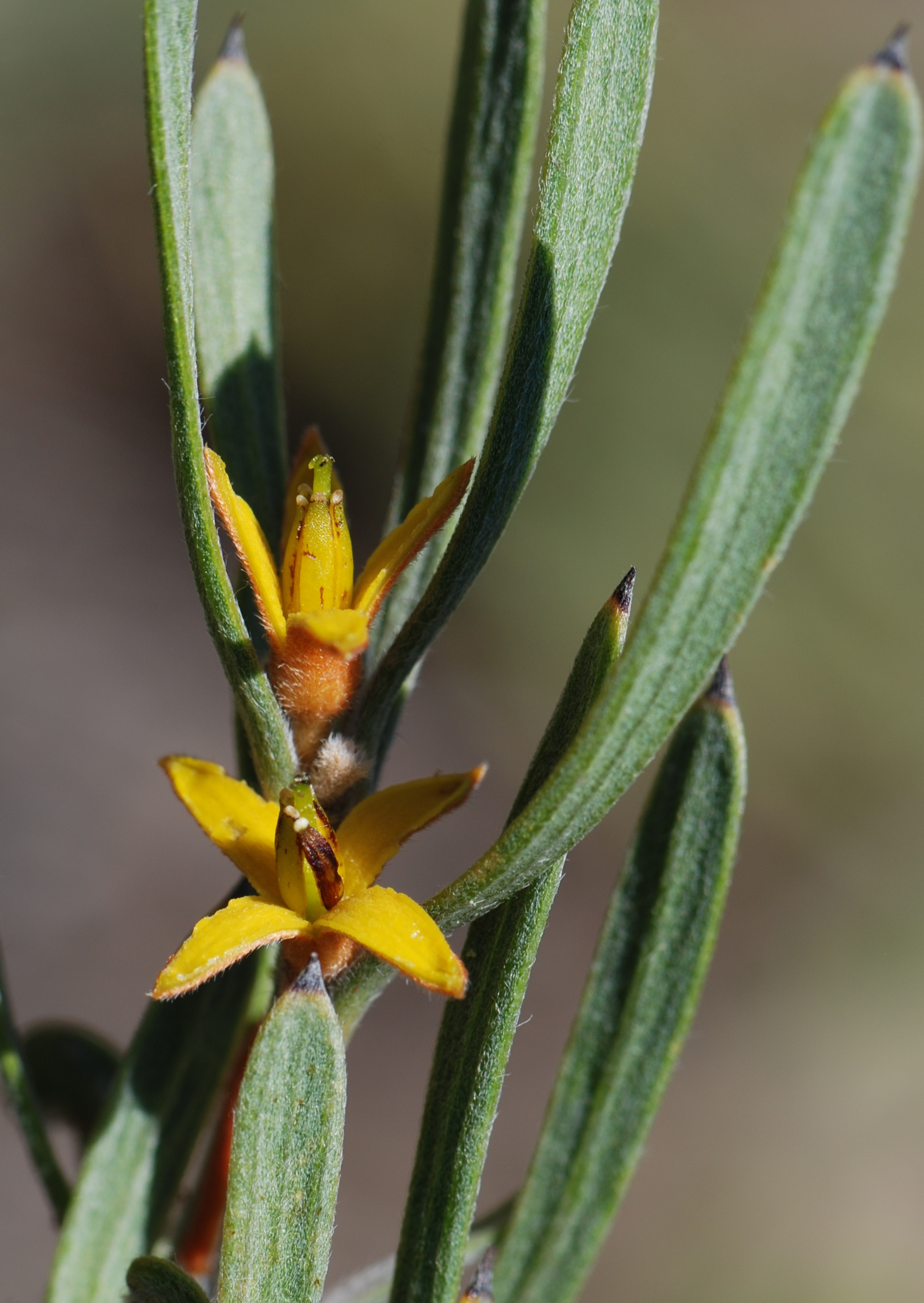
- Near Brookton

Scientific classification
- Kingdom: Plantae
- Clade: Tracheophytes
- Clade: Angiosperms
- Clade: Eudicots
- Order: Proteales
- Family: Proteaceae
- Genus: Persoonia
- Species: P. trinervis

Binomial name
- Persoonia trinervis Meisn.

Synonyms
- Linkia tortifolia (Meisn.) Kuntze; Linkia trinervis (Meisn.) Kuntze; Persoonia tortifolia Meisn. nom. inval., nom. nud.; Persoonia tortifolia Meisn.; Persoonia trinervis Meisn. nom. inval., nom. nud.

= Persoonia trinervis =

Species of flowering plant

Persoonia trinervis is a species of flowering plant in the family Proteaceae and is endemic to the south-west of Western Australia. It is an erect, sometimes spreading shrub with densely hairy young branchlets, spatula-shaped or lance-shaped leaves with the narrower end towards the base, and densely hairy yellow flowers.

== Description ==
Persoonia trinervis is an erect, sometimes spreading shrub that typically grows to a height of 0.3–1.8 m (1 ft 0 in – 5 ft 11 in) with young branchlets that are densely covered with greyish to rust-coloured hair. The leaves are spatula-shaped, or lance-shaped with the narrower end towards the base, 15–70 mm (0.59–2.76 in) long and 3–10 mm (0.12–0.39 in) wide with three or six prominent parallel veins and sometimes twisted through up to two complete turns. The flowers are arranged singly or in groups of up to four, each flower on a densely hairy pedicel 1–3.5 mm (0.039–0.138 in) long with a scale leaf at the base. The tepals are yellow, 8.5–16 mm (0.33–0.63 in) long and densely hairy on the outside. Flowering occurs from September to December and the fruit is a smooth, oval drupe.

== Taxonomy ==
Persoonia trinervis was first formally described in 1856 by Carl Meissner in de Candolle's Prodromus Systematis Naturalis Regni Vegetabilis from specimens collected by James Drummond in the Swan River Colony.

== Distribution and habitat ==
This geebung grows in heath and mallee woodland in the area between Mount Peron near Jurien Bay, Lake Grace, Frank Hann National Park and Watheroo in the south-west of Western Australia.

== Conservation status ==
Persoonia rufiflora is classified as "not threatened" by the Government of Western Australia Department of Parks and Wildlife.
