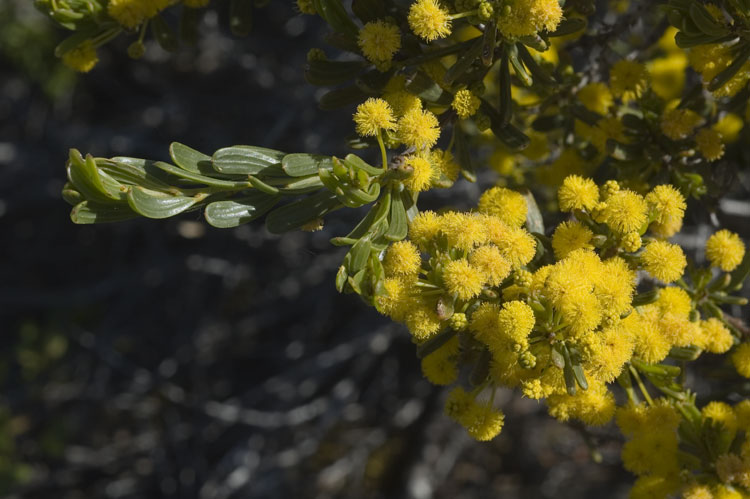
- Subsp. pinguiculosa

Scientific classification
- Kingdom: Plantae
- Clade: Embryophytes
- Clade: Tracheophytes
- Clade: Spermatophytes
- Clade: Angiosperms
- Clade: Eudicots
- Clade: Rosids
- Order: Fabales
- Family: Fabaceae
- Subfamily: Caesalpinioideae
- Clade: Mimosoid clade
- Genus: Acacia
- Species: A. pinguiculosa

Binomial name
- Acacia pinguiculosa R.S.Cowan & Maslin
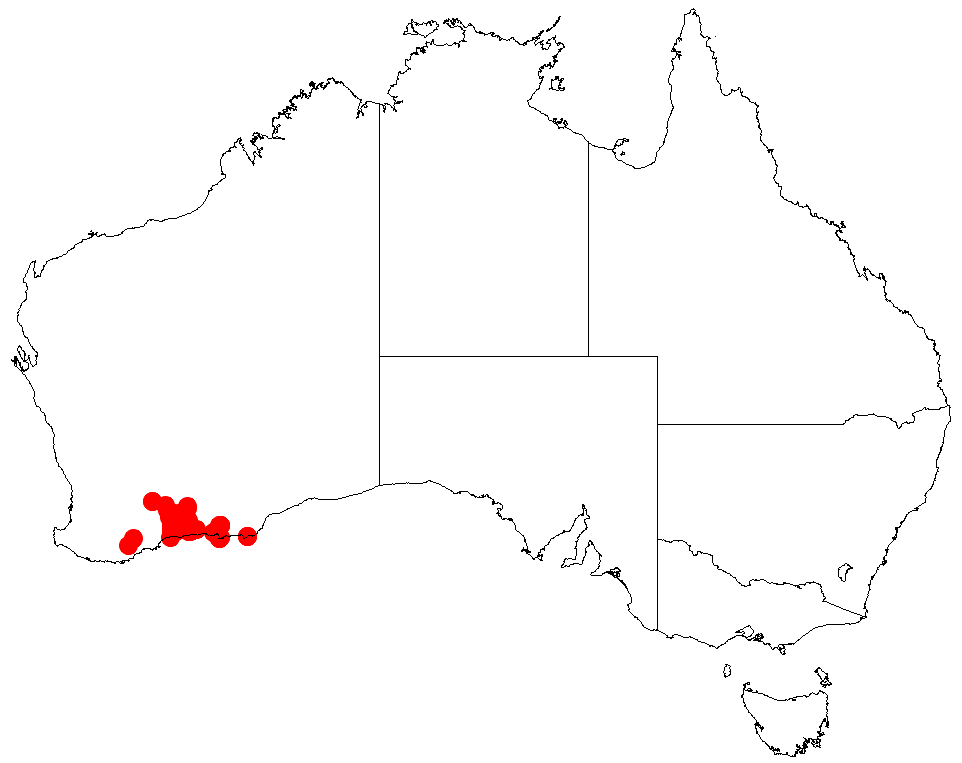
- Occurrence data from AVH

= Acacia pinguiculosa =

Species of legume

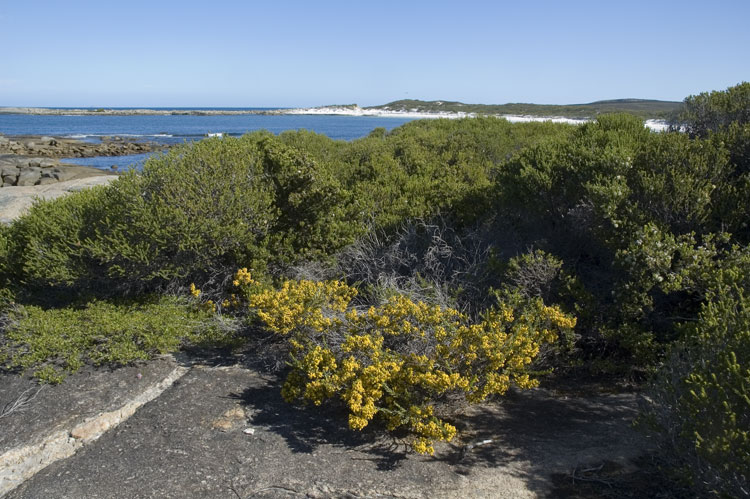
Habit in Cape Arid National Park

Acacia pinguiculosa is a shrub of the genus Acacia and the subgenus Plurinerves that is endemic to an area of south western Australia.

== Description ==
The shrub typically grows to a height of 0.3 to 1.5 metres (1 to 5 ft) and is a densely branched shrub that normally has a rounded habit. It has glabrous or sometimes hairy branchlets. Like most species of Acacia it has phyllodes rather than true leaves. The glabrous and evergreen phyllodes are ascending to erect and have a linear or obovate to oblanceolate-oblong shape and are substraight to slightly incurved. The smooth fleshy phyllodes have a length of 10 to 30 mm (0.39 to 1.18 in) and a width of 1 to 7.5 mm (0.039 to 0.295 in) and have one to five nerves per face when flat or six to eight nerves per face when more cylindrical. It blooms from August to October and produces white-yellow flowers.

== Taxonomy ==
There are two recognised subspecies:

- Acacia pinguiculosa subsp. pinguiculosa
- Acacia pinguiculosa subsp. teretifolia

== Distribution ==
It is native to an area in the Great Southern and Goldfields-Esperance regions of Western Australia where it is commonly situated on granite hills and outcrops, rises, low ranges and undulating plains growing in loam, clay, gravelly sandy or loamy sandy soils over or around granite or laterite. The range of the shrub extends from around Frank Hann National Park in the northwest to around Ravensthorpe in the south and out to near Cape Le Grand National Park and Mount Burdett in the east where they are usually a part of low scrub, shrub mallee or heathland communities.

== See also ==
- List of Acacia species
