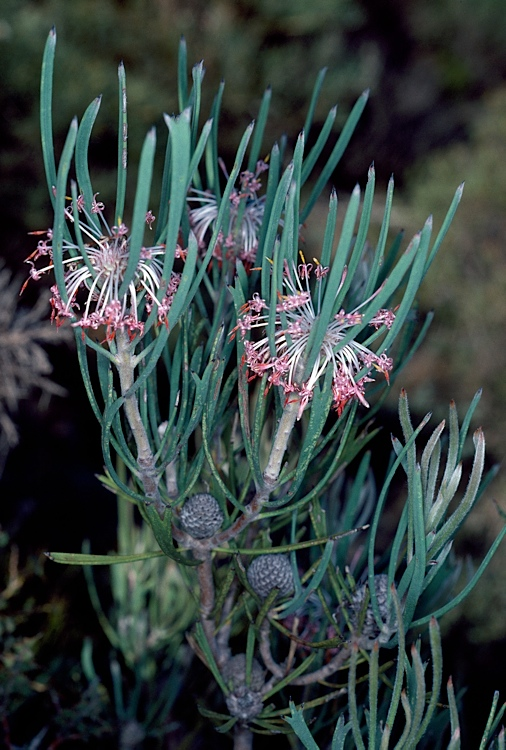
- Subspecies scabriusculus

Scientific classification
- Kingdom: Plantae
- Clade: Tracheophytes
- Clade: Angiosperms
- Clade: Eudicots
- Order: Proteales
- Family: Proteaceae
- Genus: Isopogon
- Species: I. scabriusculus

Binomial name
- Isopogon scabriusculus Meisn.

Synonyms
- Atylus scabriusculus (Meisn.) Kuntze; Isopogon scabriusculus Meisn. (1852) nom. inval., nom. nud.

= Isopogon scabriusculus =

Species of shrub endemic to Australia

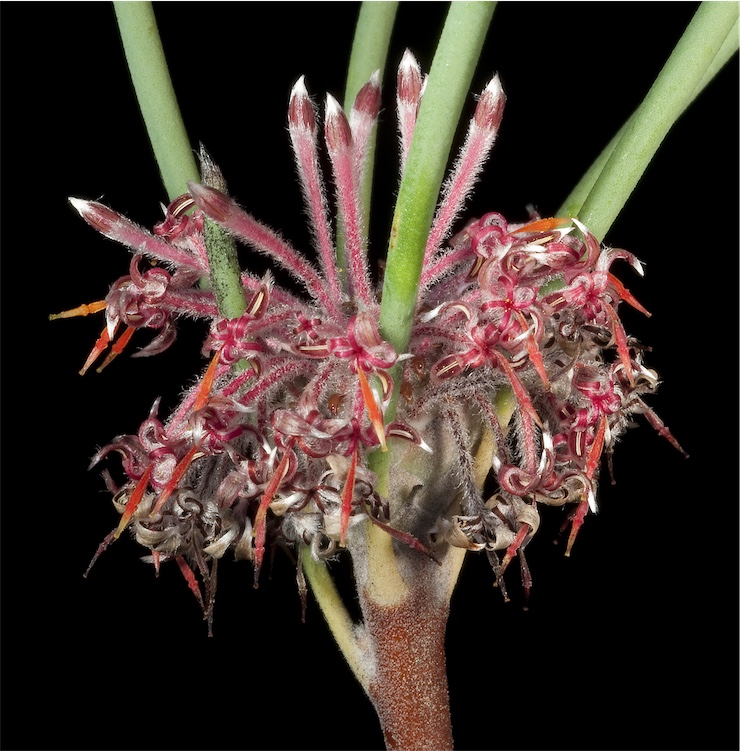
Subspecies pubiflora

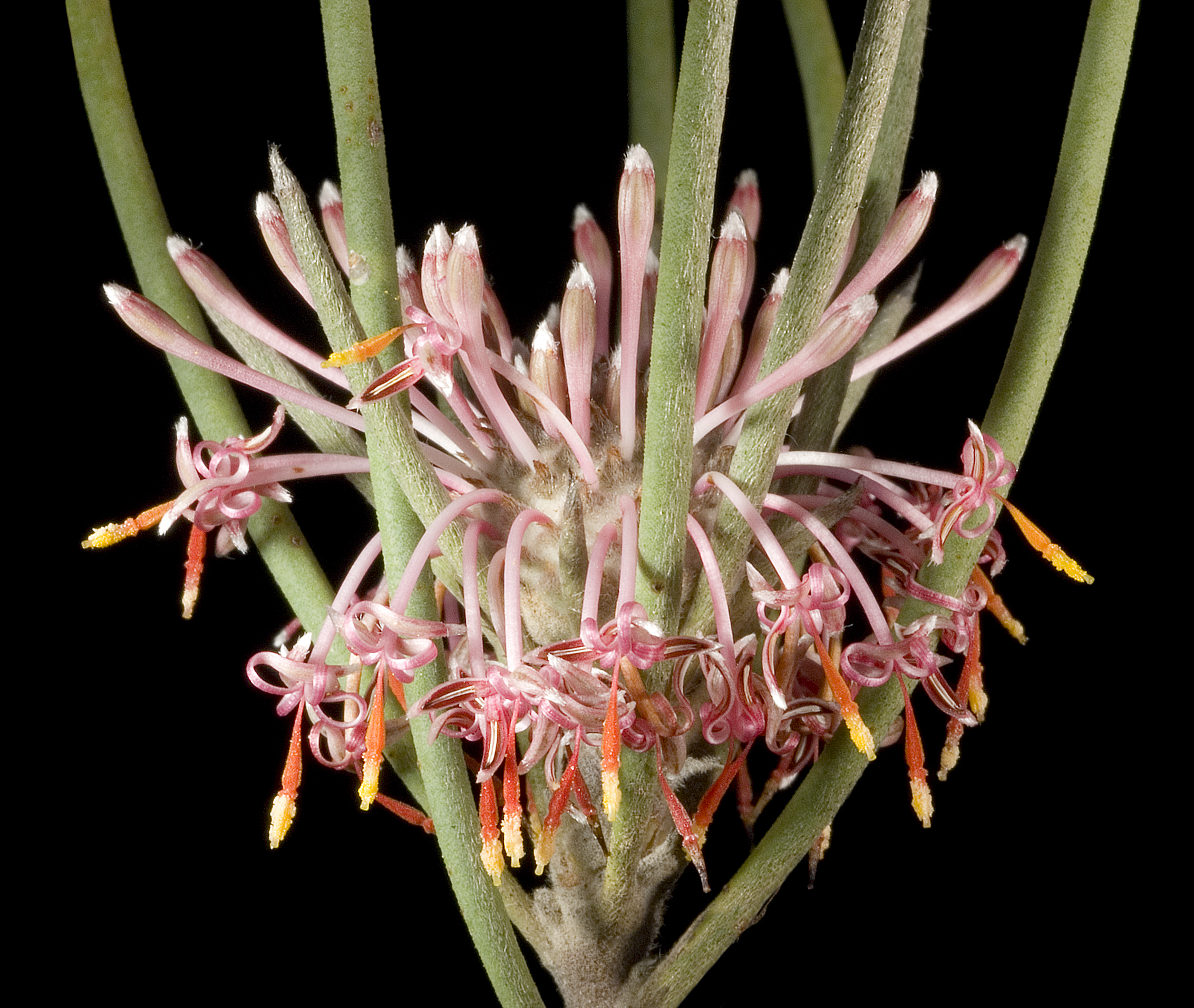
Subspecies stenophyllus

Isopogon scabriusculus is a species of flowering plant in the family Proteaceae and is endemic to southwestern Western Australia. It is a shrub with cylindrical, or narrow flat, sometimes forked leaves, and spherical to oval heads of pink or red flowers.

== Description ==
Isopogon scabriusculus is a shrub that typically grows to about 2 m (6 ft 7 in) high and wide, with reddish brown or greyish branchlets. The leaves are cylindrical, grooved or flat and narrow, up to 180 mm (7.1 in) long, sometimes forked with the undivided part up to 95 mm (3.7 in) long. The flowers are mostly arranged on the ends of branchlets, in sessile, spherical to oval heads up to 30 mm (1.2 in) in diameter with overlapping, egg-shaped involucral bracts at the base. The flowers are red or pink, sometimes hairy and the fruit is a hairy nut about 3.5 mm (0.14 in) long, fused with others in a spherical head up to 16 mm (0.63 in) long in diameter.

== Taxonomy ==
Isopogon scabriusculus was first formally described in 1856 by Carl Meissner in de Candolle's Prodromus Systematis Naturalis Regni Vegetabilis. (Meissner had previously published the name Isopogon scabriusculus in 1852 but without a description.)

In 1995, Donald Bruce Foreman described three subspecies of I. scabriusculus in Flora of Australia and the names are accepted at the Australian Plant Census.

- Isopogon scabriusculus subsp. pubifloris Foreman is a shrub up to 1.2 m (3 ft 11 in) tall with simple, cylindrical leaves up to 130 mm (5.1 in) long, hairy pink flowers up to 16 mm (0.63 in) long from September to November, and fruiting cones up to about 12 mm (0.47 in) diameter.
- Isopogon scabriusculus Meisn. subsp. scabriusculus is a shrub up to 2 m (6 ft 7 in) tall with flat, sometimes three-lobed leaves up to 180 mm (7.1 in) long, glabrous pink flowers up to 15 mm (0.59 in) long from July to October, and fruiting cones up to about 16 mm (0.63 in) diameter.
- Isopogon scabriusculus subsp. stenophyllus Foreman is a shrub up to 1.5 m (4 ft 11 in) tall with simple, grooved leaves oval in cross-section, up to 160 mm (6.3 in) long, glabrous red or pink flowers up to 15 mm (0.59 in) long from July to October, and fruiting cones about 12 mm (0.47 in) diameter.

The specific epithet (scabriusculus) means "minutely scabrous", pubiflorus means "softly hairy-flowered" and stenophyllus means "narrow-leaved".

== Distribution and habitat ==
Isopogon scabriusculus is widespread in the south-west of Western Australia where it grows on sandplains and ridges. Subspecies pubifloris grows in scrub, shrubland and woodland between Hyden, Southern Cross, Coolgardie, Lake King and the Frank Hann National Park. Subspecies scabriusculus grows in mallee, scrub and heath between Mullewa and Newdegate and subspecies stenophyllus grows in heath and shrubland, mainly between Wubin, Southern Cross and Newdegate.

== Conservation status ==
All three subspecies of I. scabriusculus are classified as "not threatened" by the Western Australian Government Department of Parks and Wildlife.
