= Electoral results for the district of Pakenham =

Victoria, Australia, district election results

This is a list of electoral results for the Electoral district of Pakenham in Victorian state elections.

== Members for Pakenham ==
First incarnation (1992–2002)
Rob Maclellan	Liberal	1992–2002
Second incarnation (2022–present)
Emma Vulin	Labor	2022–present

== Election results ==
=== Elections in the 2020s ===
2022 Victorian state election: Pakenham
Party	Candidate	Votes	%	±%
Labor	Emma Vulin	13,151	33.8	−11.5
Liberal	David Farrelly	12,605	32.4	−9.8
Independent	Brett Owen	3,157	8.1	+8.1
Greens	Michelle Maibaum	2,571	6.6	−0.8
Legalise Cannabis	Elissa Smith	2,010	5.2	+5.2
One Nation	Angela Siladji	1,321	3.4	+3.4
Family First	Christopher Gore	1,218	3.1	+3.1
Animal Justice	Hannah Pledger-Firth	978	2.5	+2.5
Freedom	Sammi Clarke	956	2.5	+2.5
Democratic Labour	Sarasadat Sarkeshik	666	1.7	+0.1
Independent	Rajvir Singh Sagoo	234	0.6	+0.6
Total formal votes		38,867	92.6	−1.1
Informal votes		3.089	7.4	+0.2
Turnout		41,956	87.38	−1.4
Two-party-preferred result
Labor	Emma Vulin	19,587	50.4	−1.8
Liberal	David Farrelly	19,280	49.6	+1.8
Labor hold		Swing	–1.8	

=== Elections in the 1990s ===
1999 Victorian state election: Pakenham
Party	Candidate	Votes	%	±%
Liberal	Rob Maclellan	17,202	53.2	−5.0
Labor	John Anderson	11,949	36.9	+0.8
Greens	Daniel Scoullar	2,571	7.9	+7.9
Independent	Frank Dean	637	2.0	+0.3
Total formal votes		32,359	97.6	−0.4
Informal votes		802	2.4	+0.4
Turnout		33,161	94.2	−0.6
Two-party-preferred result
Liberal	Rob Maclellan	18,284	56.5	−4.6
Labor	John Anderson	14,059	43.5	+4.6
Liberal hold		Swing	−4.6	

1996 Victorian state election: Pakenham
Party	Candidate	Votes	%	±%
Liberal	Rob Maclellan	17,830	58.1	+0.3
Labor	John Anderson	11,097	36.2	+7.2
Call to Australia	Carl Huybers	832	2.7	+2.7
Independent	Frank Dean	514	1.7	+1.7
Natural Law	Jac Grangien	402	1.3	−1.8
Total formal votes		30,675	98.0	+0.8
Informal votes		632	2.0	−0.8
Turnout		31,307	94.8	−0.3
Two-party-preferred result
Liberal	Rob Maclellan	18,687	61.1	−3.3
Labor	John Anderson	11,888	38.9	+3.3
Liberal hold		Swing	−3.3	

1992 Victorian state election: Pakenham
Party	Candidate	Votes	%	±%
Liberal	Rob Maclellan	16,251	57.8	+7.2
Labor	Roy Ashcroft	8,161	29.0	−12.9
Independent	Gary Hipworth	2,825	10.0	+10.0
Natural Law	John Hannon	882	3.1	+3.1
Total formal votes		28,119	97.2	−0.2
Informal votes		813	2.8	+0.2
Turnout		28,932	95.1	
Two-party-preferred result
Liberal	Rob Maclellan	18,047	64.4	+11.0
Labor	Roy Ashcroft	9,975	35.6	−11.0
Liberal hold		Swing	+11.0	
