= Matthew Bennett (politician) =

Australian politician

Matthew Bennett (20 January 1862 – 16 January 1951) was an Australian politician.

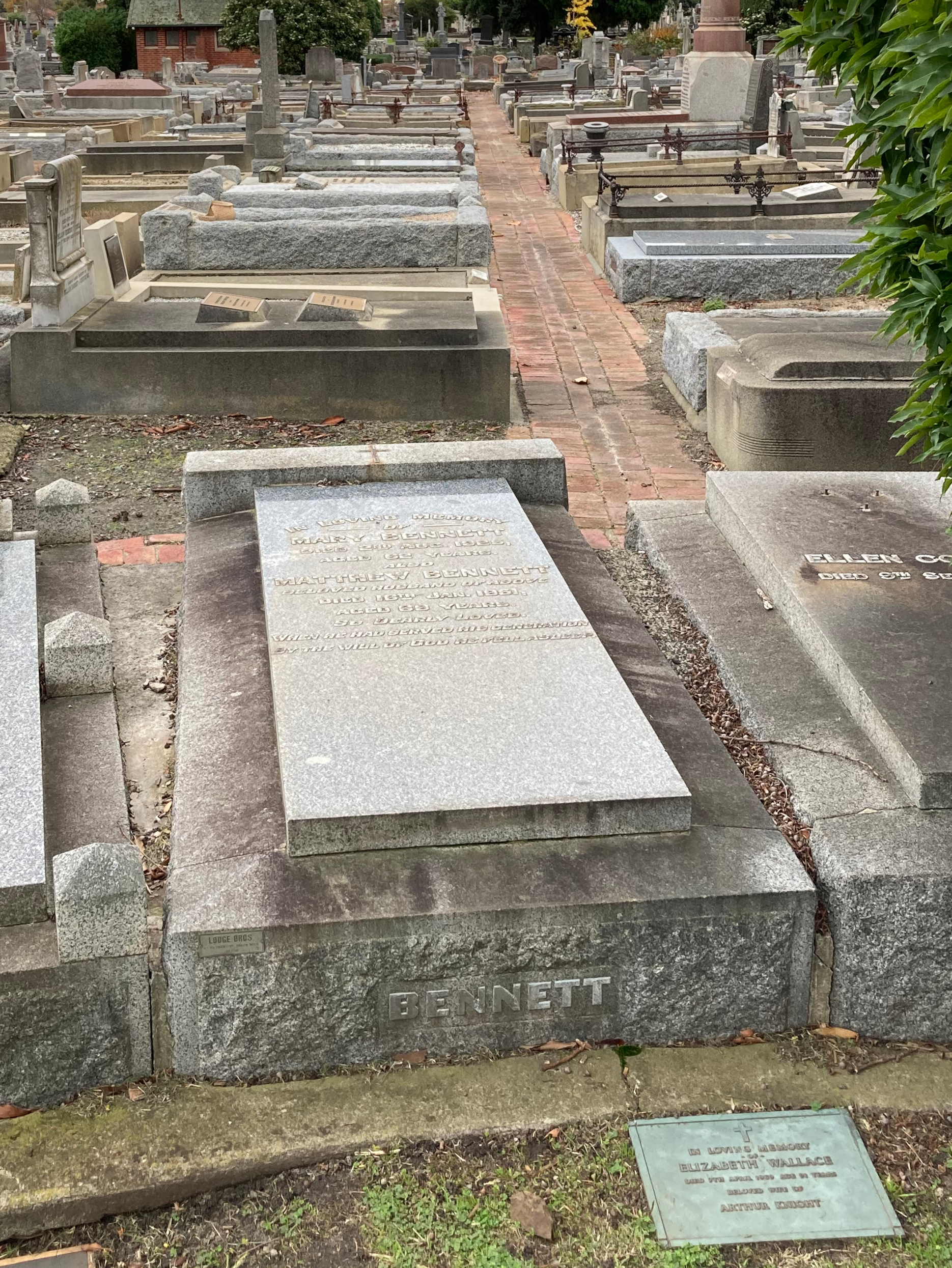
Bennett's grave at Brighton General Cemetery

Bennett was born at Carngham to farmer Joseph Bennett and Elizabeth Ann Temby. He became a farmer at Benjeroop, and on 31 October 1889 married Mary Simpson, with whom he had four daughters. Around 1906 he moved to Yannathan. An active member of the Country Party since its foundation, he served on Kooweerup Shire Council from 1925 to 1951 and was president from 1931 to 1932 and from 1941 to 1942.

In 1929 Bennett was elected to the Victorian Legislative Assembly in a by-election for Gippsland West. He served until his retirement in 1950. Bennett died at Malvern on 16 January 1951, and was buried at Brighton General Cemetery.

Victorian Legislative Assembly
Preceded by Arthur Walter	Member for Gippsland West; 1929–1950	Succeeded by Leslie Cochrane
