= Jeff Kennett =

Australian politician (born 1948)

The Honourable Jeff Kennett AC
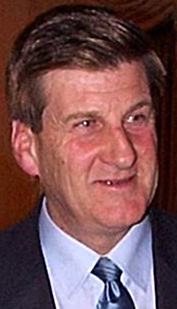
- Kennett, c. 1992

43rd Premier of Victoria
- In office 6 October 1992 – 20 October 1999
- Monarch: Elizabeth II
- Governor: Richard McGarvie; Sir James Gobbo
- Deputy: Pat McNamara
- Preceded by: Joan Kirner
- Succeeded by: Steve Bracks

Leader of the Opposition of Victoria
- In office 20 October 1999 – 26 October 1999
- Preceded by: Steve Bracks
- Succeeded by: Denis Napthine
- In office 23 April 1991 – 6 October 1992
- Preceded by: Alan Brown
- Succeeded by: Joan Kirner
- In office 5 November 1982 – 23 May 1989
- Preceded by: Lindsay Thompson
- Succeeded by: Alan Brown

Leader of the Victorian Liberal Party
- In office 26 October 1982 – 23 May 1989
- Preceded by: Lindsay Thompson
- Succeeded by: Alan Brown
- In office 23 April 1991 – 26 October 1999
- Preceded by: Alan Brown
- Succeeded by: Denis Napthine

Member of the Victorian Parliament for Burwood
- In office 20 March 1976 – 2 November 1999
- Preceded by: Constituency re-established
- Succeeded by: Bob Stensholt

Personal details
- Born: Jeffrey Gibb Kennett; 2 March 1948 (age 78) Melbourne, Victoria, Australia
- Party: Liberal
- Spouse: Felicity Kellar (m. 1972)
- Profession: Media commentator, former politician

Jeffrey Gibb Kennett (born 2 March 1948) is an Australian former politician and media commentator who served as the 43rd premier of Victoria from 1992 to 1999 and leader of the Victorian Liberal Party from 1982 to 1989, and again from 1991 to 1999. He was the member of the Legislative Assembly (MP) for district of Burwood from 1976 to 1999 and was the non-executive director of news conglomerate Seven West Media Limited from 2015 to 2019.

Kennett was previously the president of the Hawthorn Football Club, from 2005 to 2011 and again from 2017 to 2022. He is the founding Chairman of beyondblue, a national mental health advocacy organisation.

== Early life ==
The son of Kenneth Munro Gibb Kennett (1921–2007), and Wendy Anne Kennett (1925–2006; née Fanning), he was born in Melbourne on 2 March 1948. He attended Scotch College; and, although an unexceptional student academically, he did well in the school's Cadet Corps Unit. He also played football (on the wing) for the school. His failure to rise above the middle band academically almost led him to quit school in Fourth Form (Year 10 – 1963), but he was persuaded to stay on. His Fifth and Sixth Forms were an improvement, but he was still described in school reports as "[a] confident and at times helpful boy. Sometimes irritates. Sometimes works hard" (1964), and "[a] keen, pleasant, though sometimes erratic boy" (1965).

After leaving school, Kennett was persuaded by his father Ken to attend the Australian National University in Canberra, but lost interest and left after one year of an economics degree. He returned to Melbourne and found work in the advertising department of the retail giant Myer – kindling an interest for advertising that would one day earn him his living.

Kennett's life in the regular workforce was cut short when, in 1968, he was conscripted into the Australian Army. Kennett was selected for officer training and graduated third in his class from the Officer Training Unit, Scheyville (OTU), near Windsor, New South Wales, outside Sydney. He was posted to Malaysia and Singapore as Second Lieutenant, commander of 1st Platoon, A Company, 1st Battalion, Royal Australian Regiment (1RAR). This military career (and his earlier experience in the Scotch College Cadet Corps) has been noted by many biographers as an essential formative influence on the adult Kennett's character. His sense and regard for hierarchical loyalty, punctuality, and general intolerance of dissent or disobedience may be traced to this period.

Kennett returned to civilian life in 1970, reentering a divided Australian society, split by the Vietnam War, of which Kennett was a firm supporter. Having returned to Myer, Kennett became impatient with his work, and so with Ian Fegan and Eran Nicols, he formed his own advertising company (KNF) in June 1971.

Thereafter, in December 1972, Kennett married Felicity Kellar, an old friend whom he had first met on a Number 69 tram on the long trips to school. Their first son was born in 1974, followed by a daughter and two more sons.

== Political career ==
Kennett was elected as a Liberal Member of the Victorian Legislative Assembly (MLA) for Burwood in 1976, having had an interest in local politics since the early 1970s. His preselection for the seat reportedly irritated then Premier Dick Hamer, who disliked Kennett's campaigning style, and had endorsed the sitting member, Haddon Storey. However, by 1981, Kennett was promoted to Cabinet as Minister for Housing and Minister of Immigration and Ethnic Affairs. He was one of several younger MPs whom Hamer promoted to Cabinet in a bid to renew his government. Kennett retained his post when Hamer was replaced as Liberal leader and Premier by Lindsay Thompson in June of that year. Following the defeat of the longstanding Liberal government in 1982, Kennett was the leading candidate to replace Thompson despite being the youngest member of the outgoing government. On 26 October, he was elected leader of the Liberal Party and hence Leader of the Opposition. He took an aggressive posture against the Cain government, and was often criticised for his "bull-in-a-china-shop" style and his anti-government rhetoric.

Under his leadership, the Liberals were heavily defeated by Labor in 1985. Afterwards he faced a challenge to his leadership of the party from Ian Smith. Kennett survived, but increasingly, he was seen as an erratic and unapproachable leader. He faced two more challenges to his leadership in 1986 and 1987. In 1987, in one notable incident Kennett referred to the Federal Liberal leader John Howard as a 'cunt' in a mobile telephone conversation with Howard rival Andrew Peacock. The car-phone conversation damaged both Howard and Kennett politically, but aided Peacock in his push to return as Federal Liberal leader (1989).

Toward the end of its second term the Cain government had lost support and the Liberals were expected to win the 1988 election. The Liberal vote indeed rebounded strongly – they won a majority of the two-party vote – however much of this margin was wasted on landslide majorities in their heartland. As a result, the Liberals took only one seat from Labor in the capital, and were left four seats short of a majority. Failing to become premier, Kennett was again criticised within his own party, and in 1989 he was deposed in favour of a little-known rural MLA, Alan Brown.

Kennett's performance during his first stint as Liberal leader is a matter of debate. Economou sees his 1985 and 1988 election campaigns as weak, while Parkinson believes he was a significant asset in pushing the Labor government of John Cain in several key seats.

=== First term as premier ===
Kennett publicly pledged never to attempt a return to the Liberal leadership. However, when Brown proved unable to challenge the government effectively, he allowed his supporters to call a spill in 1991. Brown realised he didn't have enough support to keep his post and resigned, allowing Kennett to retake the leadership unopposed.

With Victoria facing billions of dollars of debt, Kennett was seen as "Premier-in-waiting" from the moment he retook the leadership. Cain had resigned a year earlier in favour of Deputy Premier Joan Kirner, who was unable to regain the upper hand despite being personally more popular than Kennett. The Liberals' advantage was strengthened by an important decision taken during Brown's brief tenure as leader—negotiating a Coalition agreement with the National Party. The Liberals and Nationals have historically had a strained relationship in Victoria; they had sat separately for most of the second half of the 20th century. It had been believed that Kennett had been denied victory in 1988 due to a large number of three-cornered contests in rural seats.

The Coalition went into the October 1992 state election as unbackable favourites, having been ahead in opinion polling by large margins for almost two years. They stoked the voters' anger with a series of "Guilty Party" ads, targeting many Labor ministers and highlighting concerns in their portfolios. In the second-largest defeat that a sitting government has ever suffered in Victoria, the Coalition scored a 19-seat swing, attaining a 16-seat majority in the Legislative Assembly. The Liberals won 52 seats, enough for a majority in their own right. Nevertheless, Kennett supported his coalition partner, retaining the Nationals in his cabinet.

==== State school closures ====
In the first three years of office, funding for public schools and the Department of Education was substantially reduced. 350 government schools were closed, including many Technical High School ("Tech") in Victoria, and 7,000 teaching jobs eliminated. The Tech School closures had a widespread, delayed effect two decades later when a skilled labour shortage in the state was declared by the government, attributable largely to the generation of children who were denied a trade-focused high school education, significantly reducing the number of school leavers commencing trade apprenticeships. The few who did so were insufficient to counterbalance the number of retiring tradespeople in the coming years. This directly resulted in the number of Skilled Migrant (subclass 190) visas being made available each year increasing to 190,000 from 2012 and an active campaign to entice migrants with trade qualifications to Victoria.

==== Public transport ====
Other controversial moves included the sacking of 16,000 public transport workers in a major technological upgrade of the system, and the initiation of a major scheme for privatisation of state-owned services, including the electricity (SECV) and gas (Gas and Fuel Corporation of Victoria) utilities, the ambulance service, as well as several prisons and other minor services. The sale of the Totalisator Agency Board raised $609 million. Between 1995 and 1998, $29 billion of state assets in gas and electricity alone were sold to private enterprise (for statistics, see Parkinson, Jeff, 1999). In the wake of these changes, investment and population growth slowly resumed, though unemployment was to remain above the national average for the duration of Kennett's premiership. While the benefits to the State budget figures were indisputable in the short term, the social and longer-term economic cost of the Kennett reforms have been questioned by many commentators, academics and those who suffered economically through the period of reform. This campaign of privatisations and cutbacks led to governmental acts of privatisation by splitting up Melbourne's rail (Hillside, Bayside, V/Line and West Coast Rail) and tramways (Yarra and Swanston) or budget-cutting becoming popularly known as being "Jeffed". He also cut back many regional rail services including The Vinelander (ran to Mildura, services later restored to Maryborough as a regular V/Line service in 2011) and services to Leongatha, Bairnsdale (returned in 2003), Dimboola (services later returned to Ararat in 2004).

The largest public protest in Melbourne since the Vietnam War Moratorium occurred on 10 November 1992, with an estimated 100,000 people marching in opposition to the retrenchment of many workers and the large State budget cutbacks. Kennett was undeterred by this protest, and famously commented that though there were 100,000 outside his office at Parliament that day, there were 4.5 million who stayed at home or at work.

==== High-profile capital works projects ====
The Kennett government also embarked on a series of high-profile capital works projects, such as the restoration of Parliament House, construction of a new $250 million Melbourne Museum and IMAX theatre, and a new $130 million Melbourne Convention and Exhibition Centre (which became known colloquially as "Jeff's Shed"). Other projects included a $160 million expansion of the National Gallery of Victoria; $100 million for refurbishment of the State Library of Victoria; $65 million for a new Melbourne Sports and Aquatic Centre (MSAC); and $130 million for the construction of a new civic square on the site of the old Gas and Fuel Buildings, to be known as Federation Square.

The relocation of the Formula 1 Grand Prix from Adelaide in 1993 was a particular coup for Kennett, who had worked hard with his friend Ron Walker, the Chairman of the Melbourne Major Events Company, helped deliver Melbourne the hosting rights for the event from Adelaide in 1993.

The most controversial project of the Kennett era was the $1.85 billion Crown Casino and Entertainment Complex, a gambling and entertainment centre on Melbourne's Southbank. Initial plans for a casino had been made under the Labor government, however the tendering process and construction occurred under Kennett.

A$2 billion project to redevelop Melbourne's derelict Docklands area to include a new football stadium was also undertaken, in addition to the large CityLink project, a project resurrected from the 1969 Melbourne Transportation Plan, aimed at linking Melbourne's freeways, easing traffic problems in the inner city, and reducing commuting times from the outer suburbs to the CBD.

==== Macedonian name dispute ====
In the mid-1990s, Premier Kennett backed the Greek position over the Macedonian question in his attempts to shore up local electoral support. Kennett's stance gained him supporters from the Melburnian Greek community, whereas he was referred to as "Kennettopoulos" by the Macedonian community.

At Kennett's insistence, his state government in 1994 issued its own directive that all its departments refer to the language as "Macedonian (Slavonic)" and to Macedonians as "Slav Macedonians". Reasons given for the decision were "to avoid confusion", be consistent with federal naming protocols toward Macedonians and repair relations between Macedonian and Greek communities. It was accepted that it would not impact the way Macedonians identified themselves. The decision upset Macedonians, as they had to use the terms in deliberations with the government or its institutions related to education and public broadcasting. The Macedonian Community challenged the decision on the basis of the Race Discrimination Act. After years of litigation at the Australian Human Rights and Equal Opportunity Commission (HREOC), the Federal Court and High Court, previous judicial rulings were upheld that found Kennett's directive unlawful as it caused discrimination based on ethnic background and was struck down from usage in 2000.

=== Second term as premier ===
Kennett's personal popularity was mostly average to high through his first term, though that of the government as a whole went through peaks and troughs. Without a by-election in the previous four years, the 1996 state election shaped up as the first test of the 'Kennett Revolution' with the electorate. The Coalition was expected to win a second term at the 30 March election, albeit with a somewhat reduced majority. At the federal election held four weeks earlier, while Labor was heavily defeated, it actually picked up a swing in Victoria.

However, to the surprise of most commentators, the Coalition only suffered a two-seat swing, allowing it to retain a comfortable 14-seat majority. The Coalition actually picked up modest swings in Melbourne's outer suburbs, which have traditionally decided most state elections. Several negative trends (for the Liberals) were obscured somewhat by the euphoria of victory. The government's sharp cuts to government services were particularly resented in country Victoria, where the Liberals and Nationals held almost all the seats. The loss of the Mildura seat to independent Russell Savage was an indication of this disaffection, and when in February 1997 independent Susan Davies was elected to the seat of Gippsland West, this trend seemed set to continue.

However, the verdict of many was that the 'Kennett Revolution' was far from over – indeed it was seemingly set in stone with the opening of the Crown Casino in May 1997. Kennett's profile continued to grow as he became a major commentator on national issues, including urging the new government of John Howard to introduce tax reform, and actively opposing the rise of the One Nation Party of Pauline Hanson. In this last case, Kennett did not shy away from criticising the media, but also the decision of the Howard government to not actively oppose Hanson's agenda.

Kennett was influential in Melbourne bidding for the 2006 Commonwealth Games. Three cities initially expressed interest in hosting the event; Melbourne, Wellington and Singapore. Singapore dropped out before its bid was officially selected by the Commonwealth Games Federation, leaving only two candidate cities. In the weeks prior to the announcement of the 2006 host, Wellington withdrew its bid, citing the costs involved with matching the bid plan presented by Melbourne, which became the default host without members of the Federation going to vote.

The government lost ground over the next few years, with high-profile disagreements with the Director of Public Prosecutions Bernard Bongiorno, and Auditor-General Ches Baragwanath fuelling criticism of Kennett's governmental style. Kennett's perceived antipathy to Baragwanath led to 1997 legislation to restructure the office of the Auditor-General and set up Audit Victoria. While Kennett promised the independence of the office would be maintained, many saw his government's actions as an attempt to curb the Auditor-General's power to criticise government policy. Widespread community debate and substantial public dissent from Liberal MPs and Party members ensued, with MLA Roger Pescott resigning from Parliament at the height of the debate; citing his disagreement with this Bill and Kennett's style in general. The Liberal Party lost the by-election in Mitcham.

Further scandals involving the handling of contracts for the state emergency services response system damaged the credibility of Kennett in 1997–1998, while rural dissent continued to grow.

Personal difficulties also began to affect Kennett and his family. The strains of public life led to a trial separation between Felicity and Jeff in early 1998 (patched up by the end of the year), while earlier in Kennett's first term, public scrutiny had led to the forced sale of the KNF Advertising Company, despite all Kennett's involvement having been transferred to his wife's name. There were rumors in 1998 that Kennett might retire from politics; these were mostly centred around Phil Gude, his party deputy. These eventually came to nothing.

In July 1998, Liberal MP Peter McLellan, Member for Frankston East, resigned from the party in protest over alleged corrupt Liberal Party Senate preselection, changes to WorkCover and the auditor-general's office. Again, Kennett failed to pick up the warning signs of declining support for his style of leadership.

Labor leader John Brumby took care to capitalize on each of Kennett's mistakes over this period, though his absences in rural electorates were misunderstood by many Labor MPs, and led to his replacement by Steve Bracks in early 1999. Bracks, who came from Ballarat, was popular in rural areas and was seen as a fresh alternative to Brumby, who nevertheless remained a key figure in the shadow Cabinet.

=== 1999 election loss ===
Despite Bracks' appeal, Kennett entered the 1999 election campaign with a seemingly unassailable lead, and most commentators and opinion polls agreed that the Coalition would win a third term.

However, in a shock result, the Coalition suffered a 13-seat swing to Labor. While there was only a modest swing in eastern Melbourne, which has historically decided elections in Victoria, the Coalition suffered significant losses in regional centres such as Ballarat and Bendigo. ABC elections analyst Antony Green later said that when he first saw the results coming in, it looked so unusual that he thought "something was wrong with the computer."

Initial counting showed Labor on 41 seats and the Coalition on 43; a supplementary election had to be held in Frankston East following the death of sitting independent Peter McLellan. The balance of power rested with three independents—Russell Savage, Susan Davies and newly elected Craig Ingram. Negotiations began between the Coalition and the three independents. While Kennett acceded to all but two of their demands, his perceived poor treatment of Savage and Davies in the previous parliament meant that they would not even consider supporting a Coalition minority government headed by Kennett. On 18 October, two days after Labor won the supplementary election in Frankston East, the independents announced they would support a Labor minority government. The agreement entailed Labor signing a Charter of Good Government, pledging to restore services to rural areas, and promising parliamentary reforms.

Kennett's supporters urged the Coalition to force a vote of 'no confidence' on the floor of the parliament in a last-ditch effort to force Savage, Davies and Ingram to support Kennett. However, with the Liberals divided on Kennett's future role, Kennett retired from all of his offices, saying he wished to have no further involvement in politics. Labor won the ensuing by-election in Burwood.

=== Rumoured returns to politics ===
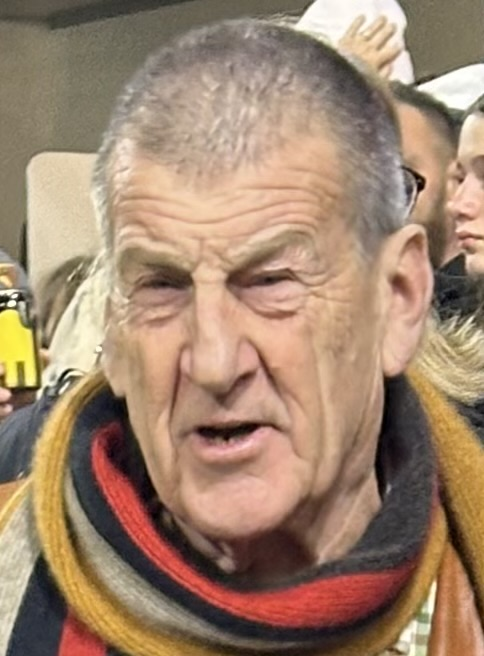
Kennett in 2023

Following the Liberals' second successive defeat in the 2002 election, rumours began that Kennett was planning a comeback to politics. The issue came to a head in May 2006 after the sudden resignation of Kennett's successor, Robert Doyle, when Kennett announced he would contemplate standing in a by-election for Doyle's old seat of Malvern and offering himself as party leader. His stance was supported by Prime Minister John Howard, who rated him as the party's best hope to win the November 2006 state election. But within 24 hours Kennett announced he would not return to Parliament rather than running against Ted Baillieu, whom Kennett had been grooming for the top post since 1999. John Howard was reported to have been "embarrassed" by having publicly supported Kennett before his decision not to re-enter politics.

In 2008, it was rumoured that Kennett was planning to stand for Lord Mayor of Melbourne. Despite endorsing future Lord Mayor John So in the 2001 mayoral elections, Kennett was quoted as saying "I think the city is ready for a change". Kennett claimed he had been approached by "a range of interests" to run for the position, but in the end did not do so. Former Liberal leader Robert Doyle ultimately won the election.

=== 2020: Indigenous voice to government ===
On 15 January 2020, it was announced that Kennett would be one of the members of the National Co-design Group of the Indigenous voice to government.

== Life after politics ==
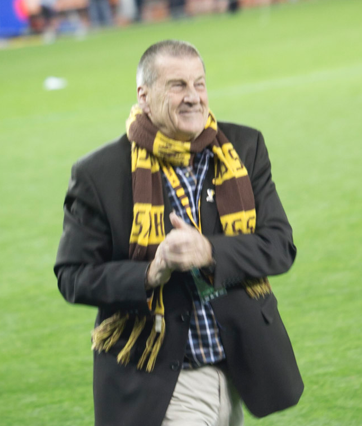
Kennett at the 2018 VFL Grand Final

In 2000, Kennett became the inaugural chairman of beyondblue (the National Depression Initiative), a body that was largely formed by the efforts of the Victorian State Government. On 24 June 2008, he announced that he would be stepping down from his role at beyondblue at the end of 2010. This did not happen. After 17 years as the chair of beyondblue, he stood down in 2017, handing the reins to former PM Julia Gillard. He stated "beyondblue is part of my DNA, outside my family, it has been my most important role.

Kennett has previously served on the boards of Australian Seniors Finance, a reverse mortgage company, and SelecTV, which was a satellite television group.

Kennett has said in an interview that he rarely thinks about the media or "bloody history", though he regrets the "disastrous" introduction of the Metcard ticketing system for trains and trams.

Kennett angered gay rights groups in July 2008 when he supported the Bonnie Doon Football Club in their sacking of trainer Ken Campagnolo for being bisexual; and compared homosexuality to pedophilia. Anti-discrimination campaigner Gary Burns pursued an action in the NSW Administrative Decisions Tribunal against Kennett for making the following statement:

"The club felt that once this had been pointed out and you had this gentleman there who was obviously close to young men – massaging young men – it ran an unnecessary risk, and that's why it decided it was best that he not perform those duties again. So the club was trying to do the right thing,"

The case was dropped due to Gary Burns' lack of funds to pursue the case.

=== Hawthorn FC presidency ===
On 14 December 2005, Kennett was made president of Hawthorn Football Club, taking over from Ian Dicker.

Following the exit of the St Kilda Football Club from the Tasmanian AFL market in 2006, Kennett was president when the Hawthorn Football Club negotiated a five-year sponsorship deal with the Tasmanian state government. The sponsorship deal was worth an estimated $12 million for which the Tasmanian government bought naming rights to the club's guernsey, and the HFC committed to playing an agreed number of pre-season and four regular season "home games" at York Park.

Kennett was instrumental in Hawthorn's 2007 5-year business plan titled "five2fifty", the core idea being that in the next five years the club will target to win 2 premierships and have fifty thousand members. As part of the plan, the football club wants to be seen as the most professional club in the AFL, and places great emphasis on the welfare of the people associated with the club.

Following Hawthorn's 2008 AFL Grand Final victory over Geelong, Kennett claimed that the Cats "lacked the mentality to defeat Hawthorn", this being in reference to the Cats' inability to counter-attack the running game of the Hawks in the aforementioned Grand Final. Kennett's comments led to the subsequent eleven-match losing streak for Hawthorn against Geelong becoming known as the "Kennett curse".

He stepped down at the end of his second three-year term in 2011, he also changed the club's constitution so that presidents could only serve two 3-year terms.

==== Second stint ====
In what Fox Footy described as a "stunning return", Kennett was announced as the president of the Hawthorn Football Club on 4 October 2017 following the sudden resignation of the incumbent president Richard Garvey. Garvey had taken criticism on the hiring and later sacking of club CEO Tracey Gaudry. Kennett subsequently appointed Justin Reeves as the club's new CEO.

On 4 October 2017 he announced that he would serve the position for a full 3-year term.

Soon after his re-appointment, Kennett and the club released a vision statement outlining the future of the club up to 2050. The first five-year strategic plan titled 'Dare to be Different' will drive the club's priorities from 2018 to 2022.

Kennett said:

"Hawthorn we aren't ones to sit back and wait, we work hard to achieve and deliver exciting results, on and off the field. Our vision for our strategic plan, "Dare to be Different", encapsulates this as we continue to strive for excellence. "We have set ourselves some ambitious targets but all are within our grasp if we continue to innovate, grow and forge new frontiers within the AFL industry."

On 6 July 2021, Kennett and the Hawthorn board announced that they would not be renewing head coach Alastair Clarkson's contract following its expiry at the conclusion of the 2022 AFL Premiership season. It was announced that Box Hill Hawks and Hawthorn development coach, former player Sam Mitchell had been chosen by Kennett and the board to become the Hawthorn coach at the end of Clarkson's reign.

=== Chairman of The Original Juice Company ===
On 12 December 2022, The Original Juice Company announced that it would appoint Kennett as Chairman and Non-Executive Director.

== Honours ==
In the Australia Day Honours of 2005, Kennett received Australia's then highest civilian honour, when he was made a Companion of the Order of Australia (AC). The honour was for "service to the Victorian Parliament and the introduction of initiatives for economic and social benefit, to business and commerce, and to the community in the development of the arts, sport and mental health awareness strategies."

In May 2000, he was also awarded an honorary doctorate – DBus (Honoris Causa) – by the University of Ballarat.

== Media work ==
For a brief period during 2002, Kennett was a radio presenter for Melbourne station 3AK, continuing an interest in mass communication which was also a feature of his premiership.

Since 2010, Kennett has been a regular contributor to Neil Mitchell's 3AW radio program every Thursday, as a social commentator.

On 28 March 2013 it was announced that Kennett had joined the Seven television network as national political commentator which will involve him appearing on breakfast show Sunrise every Tuesday and on Seven news as required.

On 12 February 2017 Jeff Kennett engaged ex-Seven West Media employee on Twitter over leaked documents potentially breaching the company's own gag order on Amber Harrison.

== Bibliography ==
- Kennett, The Hon. Jeff (2017). Dog Lovers' Poems: The perfect gift book or read for the Dog Lover (2nd ed.). WILKINSON PUBLISHING. ISBN 978-1-925642-15-5.

=== Forewords ===
- Kennett, The Hon. Jeff (2009). Foreword. Taking Care of Yourself And Your Family. By Ashfield, John (10th ed.). Peacock Publications. ISBN 9781921601347.

== Publications ==
- Kennett, Jeff. Policies and principles for Victoria, Melbourne: Sir Robert Menzies Lecture Trust, Monash University, 1993.
- Kennett, Jeff. Victoria's Commonsense Revolution, Melbourne: Alfred Deakin Lecture Trust, 1995.
- Kennett, Jeff. Australia – defining a model for the new millennium, London: University of London, Institute of Commonwealth Studies, Sir Robert Menzies Centre for Australian Studies, 1998.
- Kennett, Jeff. Kennett: Insights & Reflections, Melbourne: Wilkinson Publishing, 2017.

Victorian Legislative Assembly
Preceded by New electorate	Member for Burwood; 1976–1999	Succeeded by Bob Stensholt
Political offices
Preceded by Joan Kirner	Premier of Victoria; 1992–1999	Succeeded by Steve Bracks
Party political offices
Preceded by Lindsay Thompson	Leader of the Liberal Party in Victoria; 1982–1989	Succeeded by Alan Brown
Preceded by Alan Brown	Leader of the Liberal Party in Victoria; 1991–1999	Succeeded by Denis Napthine
Sporting positions
Preceded by Ian Dicker	President of the Hawthorn Football Club; 2005–2011	Succeeded by Andrew Newbold
Preceded by Richard Garvey	President of the Hawthorn Football Club; 2017–2022	Succeeded by Andrew Gowers
