= Acacia mackeyana =

Scientific classification
- Kingdom: Plantae
- Clade: Tracheophytes
- Clade: Angiosperms
- Clade: Eudicots
- Clade: Rosids
- Order: Fabales
- Family: Fabaceae
- Subfamily: Caesalpinioideae
- Clade: Mimosoid clade
- Genus: Acacia
- Species: A. mackeyana

Binomial name
- Acacia mackeyana Ewart & Jean White
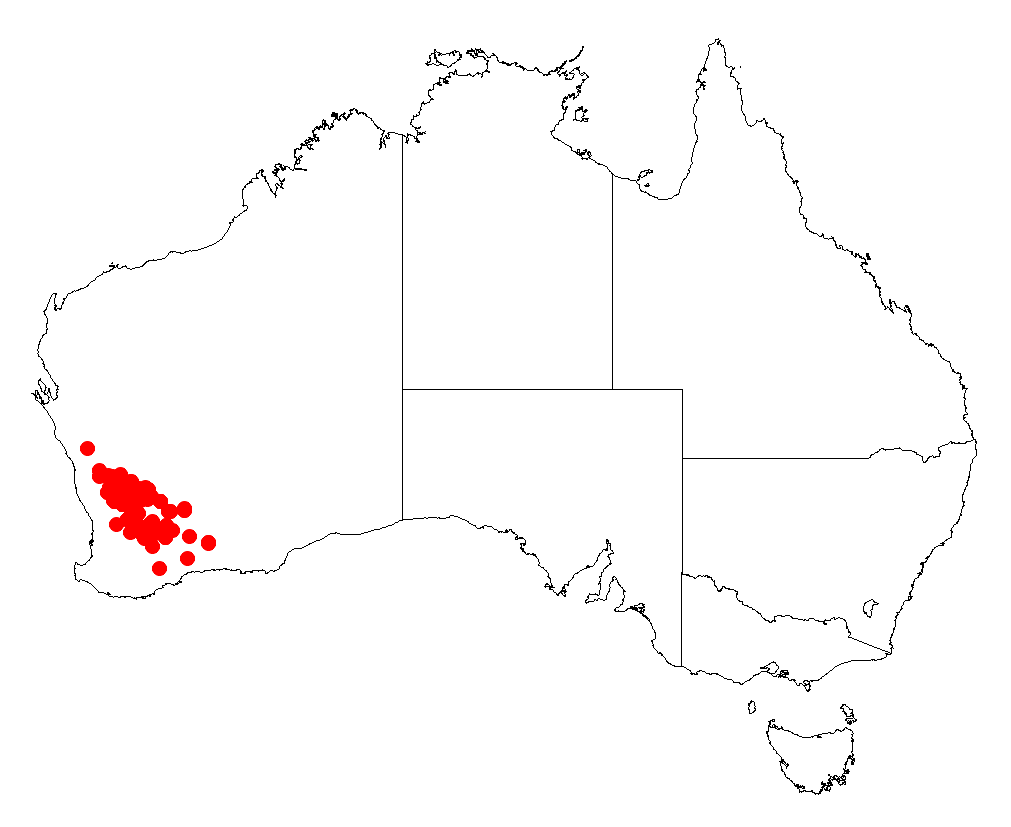

Synonyms
- Acacia leptoneura var. mackeyana (Ewart & Jean White) Blackall & Grieve nom. inval., nom. nud.; Racosperma mackeyanum (Ewart & Jean White) Pedley

Species of legume

Acacia mackeyana is a species of flowering plant in the family Fabaceae and is endemic to the southwest of Western Australia. It is a dense, domed or inverted cone-shaped shrub with hairy branchlets, ascending to erect, terete, sharply pointed phyllodes, spherical heads of golden yellow flowers, and oblong, straight or slightly curved, glabrous, crusty pods.

== Description ==
Acacia mackeyana is a dense, domed or inverted cone-shaped shrub that typically grows to a height of 0.5–1.7 m (1 ft 8 in – 5 ft 7 in) and has branchlets covered with woolly hairs. Its phyllodes are ascending to erect, curved or straight, terete, mostly 10–25 mm (0.39–0.98 in) long and 1.0–15 mm (0.039–0.591 in) wide, abruptly narrower at the end with a rigid, sharply pointed tip. There are triangular stipules less than 1 mm (0.039 in) long at the base and 20 closely parallel veins on the phyllodes. There is a single gland 3–14 mm (0.12–0.55 in) above the pulvinus. The flowers are borne in one or two spherical heads in axils on peduncles 2–5 mm (0.079–0.197 in) long, the heads 3–4 mm (0.12–0.16 in) in diameter with seven to twelve golden yellow flowers. Flowering occurs from June to August, and the pods are oblong, straight or slightly curved, 15–35 mm (0.59–1.38 in) long, 2–3 mm (0.079–0.118 in) wide, thickly crusty and glabrous. The seeds are narrowly oblong, 3–4 mm (0.12–0.16 in) long and dull dark brown to black with an aril on the end.

== Taxonomy ==
Acacia mackeyana was firt formally described in 1909 by Alfred James Ewart and Jean White in the Proceedings of the Royal Society of Victoria, from specimens collected by Max Koch near Cowcowing. The specific epithet (mackeyana) honours John Mackey, in recognition of his services towards the establishment of Wilson's Promontory National Park.

== Distribution and habitat ==
This species of wattle grows on rocky rises, breakaways, and undulating sandplain in sandy, loamy or loam-clay soils, often on laterite or granite. The bulk of the population is found from near Coorow to near Corrigin, Western Australia and Moorine Rock, with outlying populations near Mullewa, Ongerup, Ravensthorpe and the Frank Hann National Park in the Avon Wheatbelt, Coolgardie, Esperance Plains, Geraldton Sandplains and Mallee bioregion of southwestern Western Australia.

== See also ==
- List of Acacia species
