= Robert Dean (Australian politician) =

Australian politician

Robert Logan Dean is an Australian politician. He is a former member of the Victorian Legislative Assembly.

== Early life and education ==
Robert Logan Dean obtained a Doctor of Laws from the University of Melbourne. After graduating and before entering politics, Dean worked as a lawyer.

== Career ==
In 1992, Dean, a long-time Liberal Party activist, obtained preselection for the marginal Labor Party seat of Berwick; and, in the wake of the 1992 Kennett landslide, he easily defeated former Treasurer Robert Jolly.

After the re-election of the Kennett government in 1996 Dean was promoted to the position of Parliamentary Secretary for Justice which he held until the Liberals lost government at the 1999 election. Despite being associated with the forces opposed to Denis Napthine's leadership, Dean was promoted to shadow cabinet after the election serving as shadow Attorney-General and shadow minister for Aboriginal Affairs.

In 2001, a redistribution carried out by the Victorian Electoral Commission abolished his seat of Berwick as well as the neighbouring seat of Pakenham held by former Deputy Leader Robert Maclellan replacing them with the seat of Gembrook. Dean narrowly won a bitter preselection for the new seat against Maclellan.

In October 2002, Robert Doyle launched a successful coup against Napthine's leadership. An ally of Doyle, Dean was promoted to the key position of shadow Treasurer. However, the following month it emerged that Dean had failed to update his address after he moved out of his residence in Berwick after his preselection victory for Gembrook. As a result, his voting registration had lapsed, rendering him ineligible to run in the election. In Victoria, a prospective candidate must be a registered voter. Dean's political career was now effectively over. The incident derailed the Liberal campaign, with Treasurer John Brumby loudly wondering how the Liberals could manage the economy if their own shadow Treasurer could not manage his own affairs. Doyle later spoke of how the issue cost the significant momentum in the campaign.
