= Acacia dissona =

Scientific classification
- Kingdom: Plantae
- Clade: Tracheophytes
- Clade: Angiosperms
- Clade: Eudicots
- Clade: Rosids
- Order: Fabales
- Family: Fabaceae
- Subfamily: Caesalpinioideae
- Clade: Mimosoid clade
- Genus: Acacia
- Species: A. dissona

Binomial name
- Acacia dissona R.S.Cowan & Maslin
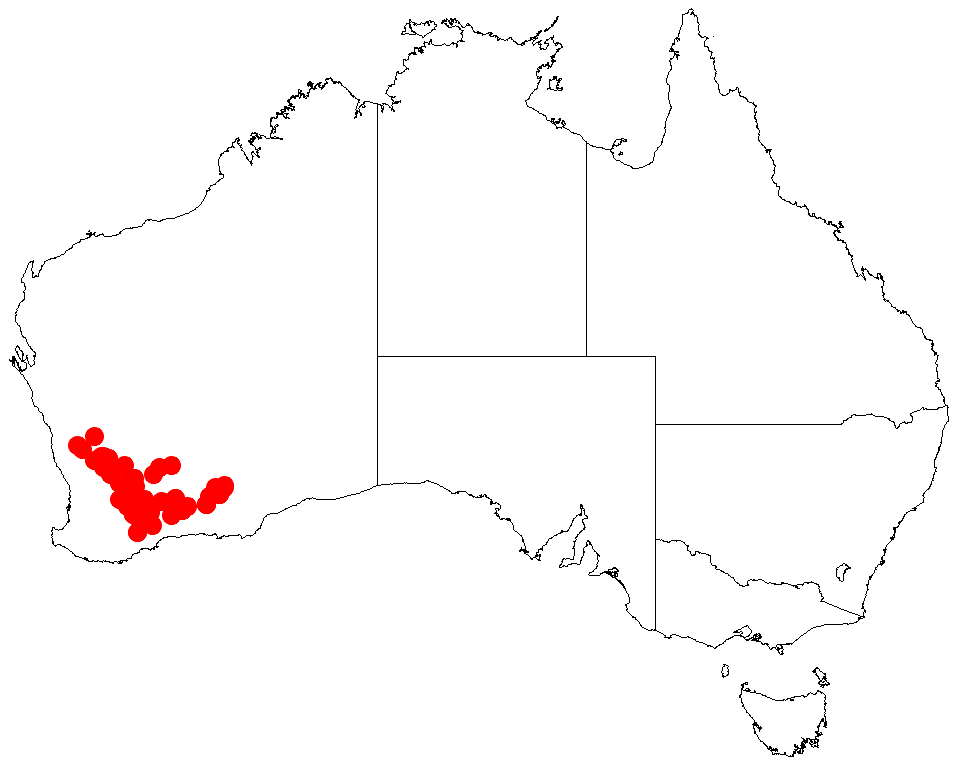
- Occurrence data from AVH

Synonyms
- Racosperma dissonum (R.S.Cowan & Maslin) Pedley

Species of legume

Acacia dissona is a species of flowering plant in the family Fabaceae and is endemic to inland areas in the south-west of Western Australia. It is a shrub with often more or less contorted branches, inclined to erect, straight, terete or subterete, sharply pointed phyllodes, spherical heads of golden yellow flowers, and linear, curved pods raised over the seeds.

== Description ==
Acacia dissona is a shrub that typically grows to a height of 0.5–2 m (1 ft 8 in – 6 ft 7 in) and often has more or less contorted branches and more or less ribbed branchlets covered with soft hairs. Its phyllodes are inclined to erect, straight, terete or subterete, 20–40 mm (0.79–1.57 in) long, 1.0–1.5 mm (0.039–0.059 in) wide and sharply pointed with many closely parallel veins. The flowers are borne in two spherical heads in axils on peduncles mostly 2–4 mm (0.079–0.157 in) long, the heads 5–6 mm (0.20–0.24 in) in diameter with 15 to 20 golden yellow flowers. The varieties flower at different times, and the pods are linear, moderately curved, thinly crusty or thinly leathery, up to 60 mm (2.4 in) long and 2.5 mm (0.098 in) wide with soft hairs pressed against the surface. The seeds are oblong, 2.5–4.5 mm (0.098–0.177 in) long, about 1.5 mm (0.059 in) wide and glossy dark brown with a conical or broadly rounded, crested, pale yellow aril on the end.

== Taxonomy ==
Acacia dissona was first formally described by the botanists Richard Sumner Cowan and Bruce Maslin in 1995 in the journal Nuytsia from specimens Maslin collected 14 km (8.7 mi) north of Lake Grace in 1975. The specific epithet (dissona) means 'discordant' or 'different', referring to the discordant nature of this species in relation to its close relatives.

In the same issue of the journal Nutsia, Cowan and Maslin described two varieties of A. dissona, and the names are accepted by the Australian Plant Census:

- Acacia dissona R.S.Cowan & Maslin var. dissona has phyllodes with veins and the intervein spaces often uniform in colour, pods distinctly constricted between the seeds, seeds about 4.5 mm (0.18 in) long with a conical aril, and flowers from July to October.
- Acacia dissona var. indoloria R.S.Cowan & Maslin has phyllodes with veins that are paler than the intervein spaces, pods scarcely constricted between the seeds, seeds 2.5–3.5 mm (0.098–0.138 in) long with a helmet-shaped aril, and flowers in August and September.

== Distribution ==
- Variety dissona has a disjunct distribution from the Merredin-Southern Cross area to near Ongerup with outliers in the Coorow-Wanarra area about 250 km (160 mi) due north-west of Merredin and the Norseman area, where it grows in a variety of soils in eucalypt woodland and mallee, in the Avon Wheatbelt, Coolgardie, Mallee and Yalgoo bioregions.
- Variety indoloria has a disjunction distribution, occurring at Ballidu-Mollerin (about 75–145 km (47–90 mi) east of Moora), near Bruce Rock and in Frank Hann National Park, where it grows in sand, sandy loam and loam, mostly in open mallee, in the Avon Wheatbelt, Coolgardie and Mallee bioregions.

== Conservation status ==
Variety dissona is listed as "not threatened", but var. indoloria is listed as "Priority Three" by the Government of Western Australia, Department of Biodiversity, Conservation and Attractions, meaning that it is poorly known and known from only a few locations but is not under imminent threat.

== See also ==
- List of Acacia species
