= Nick Economou =

- Born: Melbourne, Victoria, Australia
- Education: BA (Hons), MA, PhD
- Alma mater: University of Melbourne
- Occupation: Senior Lecturer
- Employer(s): Monash University, Clayton
- Notable work: Australian Politics for Dummies

Nicholas Economou is an Australian political scientist. He is a regular commentator in the media on Australian politics, being published in a wide range of Australian and international newspapers. He has also done commentary work for the Australian Broadcasting Corporation (ABC) and the British Broadcasting Corporation (BBC).

== Career and education ==
Economou has a Bachelor of Arts (with honours), a Master of Arts and a PhD from the University of Melbourne. In his youth, he was heavily involved in student politics at both Melbourne and Monash universities. He is currently a Senior Lecturer in Politics at Monash University in Clayton. Prior to this, he taught at the then Swinburne Institute and the former Gippsland Institute of Advanced Education (now Monash Gippsland).

During 1995 and 1996, he was Monash University Lecturer in Australian Studies at the Sir Robert Menzies Centre at the University of London.

Economou was critical of former Labor leader Kim Beazley's performance during 2006 and 2007, and called for the party to replace Beazley with now former Prime Minister Kevin Rudd.

Economou once played bass guitar in a band called Desperate Alliance that, as the Monash University entrant, won the 3RRR Victorian Battle of the Bands competition in 1986.
