= Leslie Cochrane =

Australian politician

Leslie James Cochrane OBE (29 August 1894 – 25 April 1972) was an Australian politician.

He was born in East Brighton to gardener David Cochrane and Lucy Harriett Burgess. He moved to Caldermeade with his family at the age of eight, and served with the AIF in World War I on the Western Front, where he was seriously wounded. As a soldier settler he was granted land at Kooweerup, where he became a dairy farmer. In December 1919 he married Ivy Mary Wildes, with whom he had two children. He served on Cranbourne Shire Council from 1930 to 1964, with four terms as president (1935–36, 1946, 1949–50, 1957–58).

In 1950 he was elected to the Victorian Legislative Assembly as the Country Party member for Gippsland West. He was party whip from 1961 to 1970, when he retired from politics. He was appointed an Officer of the Order of the British Empire in 1971. Cochrane died at Kooweerup in 1972.

Victorian Legislative Assembly
Preceded by Matthew Bennett	Member for Gippsland West; 1950–1970	Succeeded by Rob Maclellan
