= Alan Brown (Australian politician) =

Australian politician

The Honourable Alan Brown AM

Minister for (Public) Transport
- In office 6 October 1992 – 31 December 1996
- Premier: Jeff Kennett
- Preceded by: Peter Spyker
- Succeeded by: Robin Cooper

Leader of the Opposition (Victoria)
- In office 23 May 1989 – 23 April 1991
- Preceded by: Jeff Kennett
- Succeeded by: Jeff Kennett

Member of the Victorian Legislative Assembly for Gippsland West
- In office 2 March 1985 – 31 December 1996
- Preceded by: Seat created
- Succeeded by: Susan Davies

Member of the Victorian Legislative Assembly for Westernport
- In office 5 May 1979 – 1 March 1985
- Preceded by: Doug Jennings
- Succeeded by: Seat abolished

Personal details
- Born: Alan John Brown; 25 January 1946 (age 80) Wonthaggi, Victoria, Australia
- Party: Liberal Party
- Spouse: Paula McBurnie
- Occupation: Carpenter and joiner

Alan John Brown AM (born 25 January 1946) is an Australian former politician who served as a Liberal member of the Victorian Legislative Assembly, and Leader of the Opposition from 1989 to 1991.

A local businessman before entering politics, Brown entered the Legislative Assembly at the 1979 election as the Liberal member for Westernport, in western Gippsland, easily defeating Doug Jennings who had been expelled from the Liberal Party in 1977. He would hold this seat, renamed Gippsland West, until his retirement from politics in 1996.

Brown served on the backbench during the Hamer and Thompson governments. After the Liberals lost government at the 1982 election Brown was promoted to the shadow ministry where he served as Shadow Minister for Youth, Sport and Education, Shadow Minister for Housing and Aboriginal Affairs and Shadow Minister of Transport under the leadership of Jeff Kennett. However, after the Liberals were narrowly defeated at the 1988 election many Liberals became unhappy with Kennett's leadership. Soon after the election, Kennett was deposed in a party room coup, and Brown was elected to succeed him.

While Brown failed to take full advantage of the various crises involving the Labor government, he did successfully negotiate a Coalition agreement with the Nationals with whom relations were traditionally poor in Victoria. The Liberals had come up five seats short of winning the 1988 election, and it was thought that they would have won if not for a number of three-cornered contests in rural areas.

In 1991, Kennett's followers, with Kennett's tacit support, organised a party room coup against Brown. When the spill motion carried, Brown opted not to recontest, allowing Kennett to retake the leadership unopposed. As a concession to Brown, Kennett kept him on the frontbench.

After the Liberals were returned to power after the 1992 election Brown served as Minister for Public Transport. In late 1996 the Kennett Government appointed him as Agent General for Victoria. The resulting by-election in his then-safe seat of Gippsland West was won by independent candidate Susan Davies who would go on to play a decisive role in defeating the Kennett government.

Brown remains prominent in his local community and unsuccessfully ran for the Bass Coast Shire (Hovell Ward) in 2012.

Victorian Legislative Assembly
Preceded by Doug Jennings	Member for Westernport; 1979–1985	District abolished
District created	Member for Gippsland West; 1985–1996	Succeeded by Susan Davies
Political offices
Preceded by Jeff Kennett	Leader of the Opposition (Victoria); 1989–1991	Succeeded by Jeff Kennett
Preceded by Peter Spyker	Minister for (Public) Transport; 1992–1996	Succeeded by Robin Cooper
Party political offices
Preceded by Jeff Kennett	Leader of the Liberal Party in Victoria; 1989–1991	Succeeded by Jeff Kennett
