= Australian Reform Party =

Defunct Australian political party

Australian Reform Party Australian Reform Society Inc.
- Abbreviation: ARP; Reform
- Founders: Ted Drane
- Founded: 25 May 1996; 29 years ago
- Registered: 27 June 1997; 28 years ago
- Dissolved: Early 2019; 6 years ago
- Headquarters: 6 Kent Road; Narre Warren, Victoria
- Membership: 6,000
- Political position: Right-wing to far-right
- Slogan: "Accountable Representation for the People"
- House of Representatives: 1 / 148 (1996)

Website
- reform.org.au

The Australian Reform Party (ARP) was an Australian political party founded in 1996 and based in Victoria, focusing on gun rights following the Port Arthur massacre. It was registered in 1997 with the Australian Electoral Commission (AEC), and was also registered at the state level in Victoria and Western Australia.

Federal MP Graeme Campbell was briefly a member of the party after it merged with his newly-formed Australia First Party and became known as the Australia First Reform Party (AFRP), but the parties split after around one week.

The party was deregistered by the AEC in 2002, but remained active online with a website that was updated until early 2019.

== History ==
The ARP was founded on 25 May 1996 as the Australian Reform Movement (ARM), one month after the Port Arthur massacre which led to the federal Howard government introducing significant changes to Australia's gun laws. Its founder was Ted Drane, the president of the Sporting Shooters Association of Australia (SSAA). Shortly after its formation, federal MP Graeme Campbell, a former member of the Australian Labor Party, formed the Australia First Party (AFP) after being re-elected as an independent at the federal election in March 1996.

In June 1996, Drane and Campbell began discussions about merging their parties. Drane favoured the "Australian Reform" name (taking inspiration for the name from the Reform Party of Canada), while Campbell preferred "Australia First". On 1 July 1996, the first branch of the new party was formed at the Rowville Football Club with the combined name "Australia First Reform Party" (AFRP).

On 5 July 1996, a day before Drane was supposed to meet with Campbell in Canberra to discuss the new party, Drane withdrew after discovering that the Australian League of Rights planned to associate with the AFRP. The ARP applied for registration with the Australian Electoral Commission (AEC) on 31 July 1996, while Campbell returned to his own party.

A meeting of the ARP on 12 October 1996, which was scheduled to be addressed by independent MP Pauline Hanson, had to be moved from the University of Melbourne to a secret venue to avoid a protest by students and other groups. Drane later criticised Hanson after she formed her own political party in 1997, saying she was "unprofessional" and may have squandered a chance to unite the right in Australia.

The first election contested by the ARP was the 1997 Gippsland West state by-election in Victoria, which saw the party finish third with 9.7% of the vote.

In September 1998, artist Pro Hart donated a painting to ARP, which depicted prime minister John Howard wearing a swastika and giving a Nazi salute.

The ARP was deregistered by the AEC on 18 January 2002. It remained active online until shortly after the 2018 Victorian state election, when its website stopped updating.
