= Neville Sayers =

Australian modern pentathlete

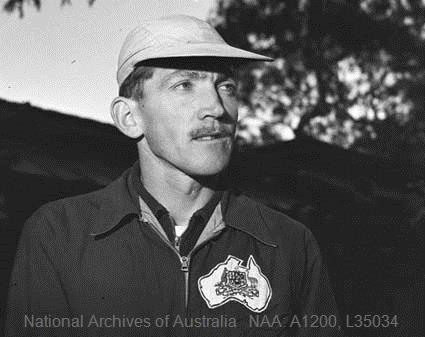
- Sayers in 1960

Personal information
- Full name: Neville Merwyn Sayers
- Born: 19 January 1927 Melbourne, Australia
- Died: 4 October 2018 (aged 91)

Sport
- Sport: Modern pentathlon, sports shooting

Neville Sayers (19 January 1927 – 4 October 2018) was an Australian modern pentathlete and sports shooter. He competed at the modern pentathlon at the 1956 and 1960 Summer Olympics and the shooting at the 1960 Games. He was a founding member of the Shooters Party in Victoria in the 1990s and was a candidate for the party at the 1997 Gippsland West state by-election and the 1997 Australian Constitutional Convention election.
