= Arthur Nichols =

Australian politician

Arthur George Nichols (born 20 April 1858, date of death unknown) was an Australian politician.

Born in Bristol to farmer George Nichols and Mary Natriss, he attended Clifton and Royal Agricultural College in England before arriving in Australia in 1880. He owned a Queensland station and invested in the stock market, but after a visit of England he was bankrupted when his agent embezzled his funds. After a period with a Sydney drama company he became a landowner in the Drouin district. In 1900 he was elected to the Victorian Legislative Assembly as the member for Gippsland West, serving until his defeat in 1902. He subsequently became a sharebroker in Melbourne. Nichols' death date is unknown.
