= Rob Maclellan =

Australian politician (born 1934)

Robert Roy Cameron Maclellan AM (born 8 March 1934) is a former Australian politician. He was a Liberal member of the Victorian Legislative Assembly, representing the seats of Gippsland West (1970–76), Berwick (1976–92) and Pakenham (1992–2002). He was Deputy Leader of the Liberal Party from 1982 to 1985.

== Background ==
Maclellan was born in Melbourne to businessman Roy James Maclellan and Amy Catherine McMicking. He attended Melbourne Grammar School and received a Bachelor of Law from Melbourne University in 1966. He has also studied history at La Trobe University. He worked in the Victorian Attorney-General's department before teaching at Sunshine and Northcote High Schools, finally becoming a farmer in South Gippsland at San Remo jointly with his brother.

Maclellan married Beverley Merrill Bonwick on 22 June 1963; they have three children. He still lives in San Remo.

== Political career ==
In 1970, Maclellan was elected as the Liberal member for Gippsland West in the Victorian Legislative Assembly. He moved to the Berwick electorate in 1976 when Gippsland West was abolished, and in that year became Minister of Labour and Industry and Minister of Consumer Affairs. He was made Minister of Transport in 1982.

Following the Labor victory in that year's election, Maclellan became Deputy Leader of the Opposition, a position he held until 1985. He was Shadow Minister for Conservation, Forests and Lands during that time, but stepped down from the front bench in 1985. He returned in 1989 as Shadow Attorney-General and Shadow Minister for Police and Emergency Services. He then held the Small Business (1990–91) and Planning (1991–92) shadow portfolios. In 1992, he moved to the new electorate of Pakenham.

Maclellan became Minister for Planning when the Liberals won office at the 1992 election, led by Jeff Kennett. Local Government was added to his portfolio in 1996. Maclellan was an integral part of Kennett's sweeping programme to boost Victoria's economy. He was opposed to local control of planning matters deemed to be of strategic importance of the economic growth of the State. He argued: "Devolution of State planning powers to a large number of municipal councils ... resulted in an overemphasis on local aspects of planning and development at a cost to the wider community". He instituted the Victoria Planning Provisions (VPPs), which were integrated into all Victorian planning schemes. In Crikey, Stephen Rowley wrote of his role as Planning Minister: "Maclellan was notoriously and unapologetically interventionist, and despite the ultimate fate of the Kennett government, his "can-do" attitude mostly benefited him politically".

After Labor won the 1999 state election, he resigned from the Liberal front bench. He retired from parliament in 2002, after his electorate of Pakenham was abolished and he failed to win Liberal preselection for new seat of Gembrook.

== Recognition ==
Maclellan was made a Member of the Order of Australia (AM), 2005, "For service to the Victorian Parliament, particularly in the areas of planning and transport, and to the community."

== Controversy ==
In late 2011, Maclellan was identified as having made several personal requests to the sitting Victorian Planning Minister Matthew Guy to support rezoning of farmland at Ventnor on Phillip Island, that a family friend needed to make a possible housing development viable. The media regarded the interventions as inappropriate. Guy authorised the rezoning but it was later retracted after pressure from other Liberal Party members and the public.

Parliament of Victoria
Preceded by Leslie Cochrane	Member for Gippsland West; 1970–1976	Succeeded by Seat abolished
Preceded by New seat	Member for Berwick; 1976–1992	Succeeded by Robert Dean
Preceded by New seat	Member for Pakenham; 1992–2002	Succeeded by Seat abolished
