= Frank Hann National Park =

National park in Western Australia

- IUCN category II (national park)
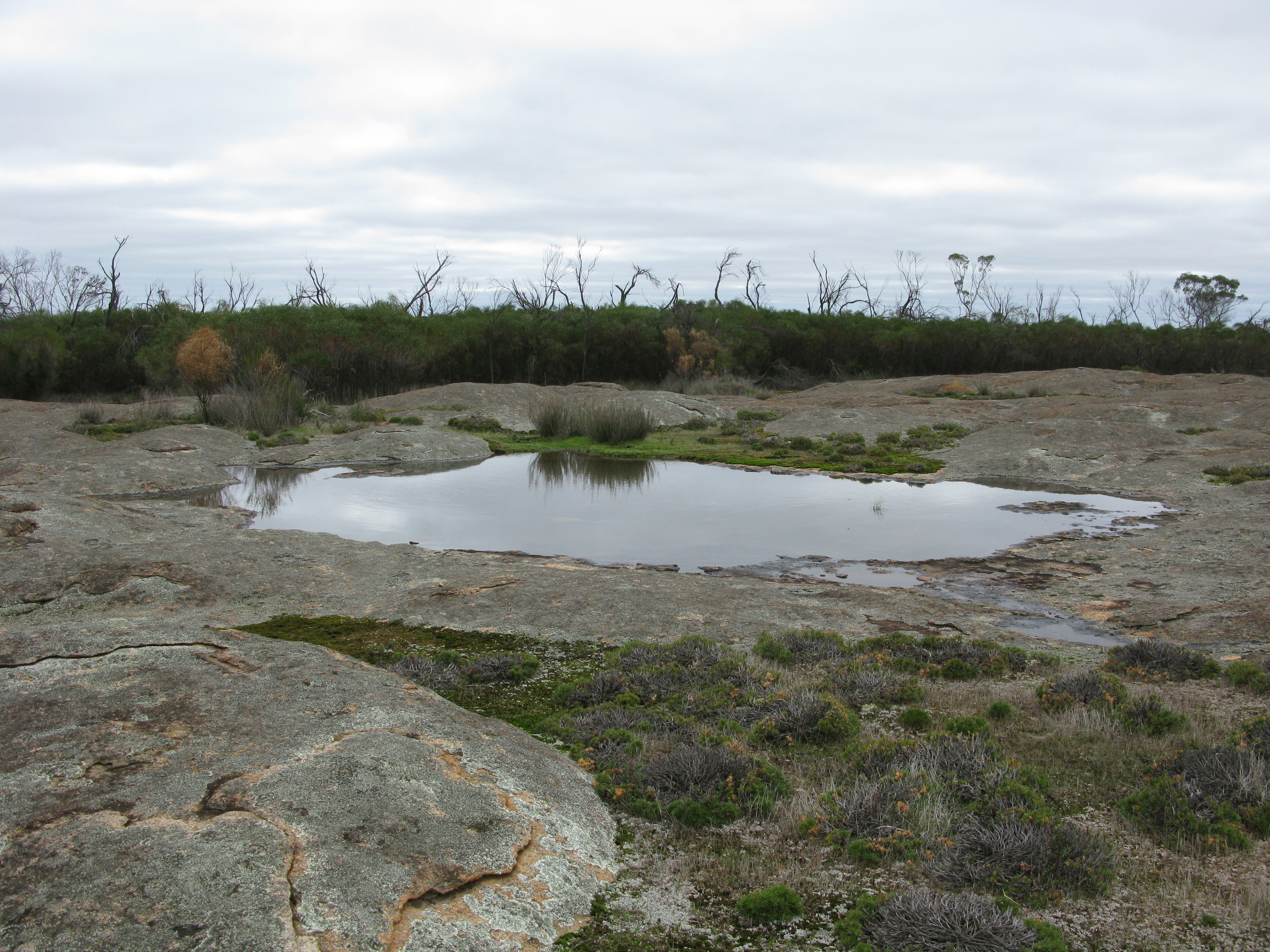
- The Lilian Stokes Rockpools at Frank Hahn National Park

- Location within Western Australia
- Location: Western Australia
- Nearest city: Lake King
- Coordinates: 32°55′41″S 120°14′14″E
- Area: 675.5 km^{2} (260.8 sq mi)
- Established: 1970
- Governing body: Department of Parks and Wildlife
- Website: Official website

Frank Hann National Park is a national park in Western Australia, located 428 kilometres (266 mi) east-southeast of the capital, Perth in the Shire of Lake Grace. It was named for Frank Hann, an early explorer of the district. The park contains a wide array of flora, including seasonal wildflowers.

It was officially named on 30 October 1970.

The park is found within the Eastern Mallee (IBRA) subregion in southern Western Australia. The park is mostly composed of heathland and scrubland situated on an inland sandplain. No entrance fee is required to enter the park but no facilities are available to visitors in the park.

Some of the flora found within the park include Acacia mackeyana, Acacia dissona and Banksia xylothemelia.

Fauna found within the park include lizards such as the marbled gecko, the clawless gecko, the crested dragon, the callose-palmed shining-skink and the bright crevice skink. Many frog species also inhabit the area including Myobatrachus gouldii, Pseudophryne guentheri and Limnodynastes dorsalis. Birdlife such as the emu, the nankeen kestrel, the brown falcon, the little eagle, the crested pigeon, the brush bronzewing, the mulga parrot and the Australian bustard have all been found within the park boundaries.

The park also supports an array of mammals including short-beaked echidna, the western quoll, Gilbert's dunnart, the honey possum, the western grey kangaroo, the western brush wallaby, Gould's wattled bat and Mitchell's hopping mouse.

== See also ==
- Protected areas of Western Australia
