= Susan Davies =

Australian politician

Member of the Victorian Legislative Assembly for Gippsland West
- In office 1 February 1997 – 29 November 2002
- Preceded by: Alan Brown
- Succeeded by: District abolished

Personal details
- Born: 1954 (age 71–72) Mirboo North, Victoria
- Party: Independent
- Education: La Trobe University
- Occupation: Teacher, farmer, director
- Committees: Public Accounts and Estimates Committee (Vic) 1999–2002

Susan Margaret Davies (born 1954) is an Australian former politician.

Davies was born in Mirboo North, Victoria, to parents Richard Llewellyn and Jean Margaret Davies. She attended Leongatha High School (1966–70) and Watsonia High School in 1971, where she completed her Higher School Certificate. She received a Bachelor of Arts and a Diploma of Education in 1976 from La Trobe University. She subsequently became a secondary school teacher, and began farming in addition to this in 1989.

Davies joined the Labor Party in 1993, as part of the rural protest against Kennett government funding and service cuts, and was the Labor candidate for Gippsland West in the 1996 Victorian state election but lost. Sitting Liberal MP Alan Brown resigned less than a year after the state election, precipitating a by-election. Labor declined to stand a candidate for this very safe Liberal seat; most of the area covered by Gippsland West had been in the hands of a conservative party for more than a century and a half. Davies resigned from the Labor Party and contested the by-election as an independent. The Liberal primary vote plunged by over 16 percent, allowing Davies to emerge victorious by 159 votes.

She retained her seat in the 1999 state election, and held the balance of power with two other rural Independents when a significant, mostly rural, and very anti-Coalition swing led to a hung parliament. Davies played a key role in developing the "Independents' Charter", which the three independents used as a basis for backing a minority government under Steve Bracks and the Labor Party. She served on the Public Accounts and Estimates committee during the following parliamentary term. Prior to the 2002 election, Gippsland West was essentially replaced by the newly created seat of Bass, which was notionally Liberal in a traditional matchup. Davies contested Bass, but was pushed into third place on the primary vote behind former Liberal MLC Ken Smith.

She later re-joined the Labor Party and contested the 2004 federal election as the Labor candidate for the federal seat of La Trobe. She was defeated by the Liberal candidate, Jason Wood.

Davies now runs a small farm in South Gippsland, is part of a local food producers' network, ”Grow Lightly” and Korumburra Landcare. She graduated from the AICD company director’s course in 2003, and was a founding director on several organisations, including Bass Coast Community Foundation, Chairing Energy Innovation Co-operative Ltd and currently Country University Centre Bass Coast, as well as serving on other boards.

Victorian Legislative Assembly
Preceded by Alan Brown	Member for Gippsland West; 1997–2002	District abolished
