= Arthur Walter (politician) =

Australian politician

Arthur Lewis Nathan Walter (27 September 1873 – 22 April 1951) was an Australian politician.

Born at Coghill's Creek in Victoria to farmer Nathan Walter and Elizabeth Ann Stubbs, Walter attended state schools and then the Ballarat School of Mines, spending two years mining in Tasmania and Western Australia. He then became a farmer, owning land at Werribee, Little River and Benalla. On 27 April 1904, he married Jane Caldow, with whom he had four daughters. In 1924 he was elected to the Victorian Legislative Assembly as the Country Party member for Gippsland West, becoming the party's deputy leader. At the time he was also the party's vice-president, having served as a central councillor (1916–29), treasurer (1917–20) and chief president (1920–22). In 1929 he resigned from parliament to contest the federal seat of Indi, without success. He later became a grazier at Melton and chair of Victorian Newspapers Ltd. Walter died in 1951 at Bacchus Marsh and was cremated. His ashes are at Fawkner Cemetery, VIC.
