= Electoral district of Gippsland West =

Coordinates: 38°20′S 145°40′E

Gippsland West Victoria—Legislative Assembly
- State: Victoria
- Dates current: 1889–1976, 1985–2002
- Demographic: Rural

The electoral district of Gippsland West was an electoral district of the Legislative Assembly in the Australian state of Victoria. It was created by the Electoral Act Amendment Act 1888 along with Gippsland Central and Gippsland East. Gippsland North and Gippsland South were resized at the same time. The electorate was dissolved in 2002.

The principal towns of Gippsland West included Pakenham, Drouin, Warragul and Trafalgar.

== Members for Gippsland West ==
First incarnation (1889–1976)
Member	Party	Term
Arthur Groom	None	1889–1892
George Turner	None	1892–1900
Arthur Nichols	Ministerialist/Independent	1900–1902
John Mackey	Ministerialist	1902–1909
John Mackey	Commonwealth Liberal	1909–1917
John Mackey	Nationalist	1917–1924
Arthur Walter	Country	1924–1929
Matthew Bennett	Country	1929–1950
Leslie Cochrane	Country	1950–1970
Rob Maclellan	Liberal	1970–1976
Second incarnation (1985–2002)
Member	Party	Term
Alan Brown	Liberal	1985–1996
Susan Davies	Independent	1997–2002
